

600001–600100 

|-bgcolor=#d6d6d6
| 600001 ||  || — || March 6, 2011 || Bergisch Gladbach || W. Bickel || 7:4 || align=right | 3.6 km || 
|-id=002 bgcolor=#d6d6d6
| 600002 ||  || — || March 6, 2011 || Kitt Peak || Spacewatch ||  || align=right | 2.2 km || 
|-id=003 bgcolor=#E9E9E9
| 600003 ||  || — || March 6, 2011 || Kitt Peak || Spacewatch ||  || align=right | 1.2 km || 
|-id=004 bgcolor=#fefefe
| 600004 ||  || — || February 12, 2000 || Apache Point || SDSS Collaboration ||  || align=right data-sort-value="0.84" | 840 m || 
|-id=005 bgcolor=#E9E9E9
| 600005 ||  || — || March 10, 2011 || Kitt Peak || Spacewatch ||  || align=right | 1.7 km || 
|-id=006 bgcolor=#fefefe
| 600006 ||  || — || March 10, 2011 || Kitt Peak || Spacewatch ||  || align=right data-sort-value="0.79" | 790 m || 
|-id=007 bgcolor=#E9E9E9
| 600007 ||  || — || March 26, 2007 || Kitt Peak || Spacewatch ||  || align=right | 2.4 km || 
|-id=008 bgcolor=#d6d6d6
| 600008 ||  || — || February 25, 2011 || Mount Lemmon || Mount Lemmon Survey ||  || align=right | 2.2 km || 
|-id=009 bgcolor=#d6d6d6
| 600009 ||  || — || May 25, 2006 || Mauna Kea || Mauna Kea Obs. || 7:4 || align=right | 3.0 km || 
|-id=010 bgcolor=#E9E9E9
| 600010 ||  || — || March 23, 2003 || Apache Point || SDSS Collaboration ||  || align=right data-sort-value="0.75" | 750 m || 
|-id=011 bgcolor=#fefefe
| 600011 ||  || — || January 13, 1996 || Kitt Peak || Spacewatch ||  || align=right data-sort-value="0.73" | 730 m || 
|-id=012 bgcolor=#E9E9E9
| 600012 ||  || — || March 10, 2011 || Kitt Peak || Spacewatch ||  || align=right | 1.3 km || 
|-id=013 bgcolor=#E9E9E9
| 600013 ||  || — || March 10, 2011 || Kitt Peak || Spacewatch ||  || align=right data-sort-value="0.68" | 680 m || 
|-id=014 bgcolor=#E9E9E9
| 600014 ||  || — || March 14, 2011 || Mount Lemmon || Mount Lemmon Survey ||  || align=right data-sort-value="0.80" | 800 m || 
|-id=015 bgcolor=#E9E9E9
| 600015 ||  || — || March 6, 2011 || Mount Lemmon || Mount Lemmon Survey ||  || align=right data-sort-value="0.93" | 930 m || 
|-id=016 bgcolor=#d6d6d6
| 600016 ||  || — || August 4, 2013 || Haleakala || Pan-STARRS ||  || align=right | 2.8 km || 
|-id=017 bgcolor=#d6d6d6
| 600017 ||  || — || November 7, 2015 || Haleakala || Pan-STARRS || 7:4 || align=right | 2.7 km || 
|-id=018 bgcolor=#fefefe
| 600018 ||  || — || March 1, 2011 || Mount Lemmon || Mount Lemmon Survey ||  || align=right data-sort-value="0.61" | 610 m || 
|-id=019 bgcolor=#fefefe
| 600019 ||  || — || March 24, 2011 || Piszkesteto || Z. Kuli, K. Sárneczky ||  || align=right data-sort-value="0.72" | 720 m || 
|-id=020 bgcolor=#E9E9E9
| 600020 ||  || — || September 30, 2005 || Mount Lemmon || Mount Lemmon Survey ||  || align=right | 1.3 km || 
|-id=021 bgcolor=#E9E9E9
| 600021 ||  || — || July 31, 2000 || Cerro Tololo || M. W. Buie, S. D. Kern ||  || align=right data-sort-value="0.76" | 760 m || 
|-id=022 bgcolor=#fefefe
| 600022 ||  || — || March 29, 2011 || Piszkesteto || Z. Kuli, K. Sárneczky ||  || align=right | 1.1 km || 
|-id=023 bgcolor=#E9E9E9
| 600023 ||  || — || March 28, 2011 || Mount Lemmon || Mount Lemmon Survey ||  || align=right | 1.3 km || 
|-id=024 bgcolor=#E9E9E9
| 600024 ||  || — || April 25, 2003 || Kitt Peak || Spacewatch ||  || align=right data-sort-value="0.71" | 710 m || 
|-id=025 bgcolor=#E9E9E9
| 600025 ||  || — || March 30, 2011 || Mount Lemmon || Mount Lemmon Survey ||  || align=right data-sort-value="0.70" | 700 m || 
|-id=026 bgcolor=#E9E9E9
| 600026 ||  || — || August 12, 2007 || Socorro || LINEAR ||  || align=right | 1.5 km || 
|-id=027 bgcolor=#E9E9E9
| 600027 ||  || — || February 7, 2002 || Palomar || NEAT ||  || align=right | 1.2 km || 
|-id=028 bgcolor=#E9E9E9
| 600028 ||  || — || November 9, 1996 || Kitt Peak || Spacewatch ||  || align=right | 1.0 km || 
|-id=029 bgcolor=#E9E9E9
| 600029 ||  || — || April 4, 2003 || Kitt Peak || Spacewatch ||  || align=right data-sort-value="0.85" | 850 m || 
|-id=030 bgcolor=#E9E9E9
| 600030 ||  || — || March 30, 2011 || Mount Lemmon || Mount Lemmon Survey ||  || align=right | 1.2 km || 
|-id=031 bgcolor=#d6d6d6
| 600031 ||  || — || September 13, 2007 || Mount Lemmon || Mount Lemmon Survey ||  || align=right | 3.0 km || 
|-id=032 bgcolor=#E9E9E9
| 600032 ||  || — || March 11, 2011 || Mount Lemmon || Mount Lemmon Survey ||  || align=right | 1.3 km || 
|-id=033 bgcolor=#fefefe
| 600033 ||  || — || March 29, 2011 || Mount Lemmon || Mount Lemmon Survey || H || align=right data-sort-value="0.62" | 620 m || 
|-id=034 bgcolor=#E9E9E9
| 600034 ||  || — || November 1, 2005 || Kitt Peak || Spacewatch ||  || align=right data-sort-value="0.71" | 710 m || 
|-id=035 bgcolor=#fefefe
| 600035 ||  || — || February 23, 2007 || Kitt Peak || Spacewatch ||  || align=right data-sort-value="0.78" | 780 m || 
|-id=036 bgcolor=#fefefe
| 600036 ||  || — || September 6, 2012 || Mount Lemmon || Mount Lemmon Survey ||  || align=right data-sort-value="0.80" | 800 m || 
|-id=037 bgcolor=#fefefe
| 600037 ||  || — || August 27, 2005 || Palomar || NEAT ||  || align=right | 1.1 km || 
|-id=038 bgcolor=#E9E9E9
| 600038 ||  || — || February 25, 2011 || Kitt Peak || Spacewatch ||  || align=right | 1.0 km || 
|-id=039 bgcolor=#E9E9E9
| 600039 ||  || — || December 10, 2001 || Nashville || R. Clingan ||  || align=right data-sort-value="0.93" | 930 m || 
|-id=040 bgcolor=#fefefe
| 600040 ||  || — || April 5, 2011 || Mount Lemmon || Mount Lemmon Survey ||  || align=right data-sort-value="0.72" | 720 m || 
|-id=041 bgcolor=#fefefe
| 600041 ||  || — || October 6, 2005 || Mount Lemmon || Mount Lemmon Survey ||  || align=right data-sort-value="0.62" | 620 m || 
|-id=042 bgcolor=#fefefe
| 600042 ||  || — || September 16, 2012 || Mount Lemmon || Mount Lemmon Survey ||  || align=right data-sort-value="0.62" | 620 m || 
|-id=043 bgcolor=#E9E9E9
| 600043 ||  || — || March 25, 2011 || Mount Lemmon || Mount Lemmon Survey ||  || align=right | 1.3 km || 
|-id=044 bgcolor=#E9E9E9
| 600044 ||  || — || April 5, 2011 || Mount Lemmon || Mount Lemmon Survey ||  || align=right | 1.2 km || 
|-id=045 bgcolor=#fefefe
| 600045 ||  || — || March 29, 2011 || Mount Lemmon || Mount Lemmon Survey ||  || align=right data-sort-value="0.75" | 750 m || 
|-id=046 bgcolor=#E9E9E9
| 600046 ||  || — || March 14, 2011 || Mount Lemmon || Mount Lemmon Survey ||  || align=right | 1.1 km || 
|-id=047 bgcolor=#E9E9E9
| 600047 ||  || — || March 25, 2011 || Haleakala || Pan-STARRS ||  || align=right | 2.0 km || 
|-id=048 bgcolor=#fefefe
| 600048 ||  || — || February 10, 2003 || Kitt Peak || Spacewatch ||  || align=right | 1.2 km || 
|-id=049 bgcolor=#E9E9E9
| 600049 ||  || — || March 11, 2011 || Kitt Peak || Spacewatch ||  || align=right data-sort-value="0.96" | 960 m || 
|-id=050 bgcolor=#d6d6d6
| 600050 ||  || — || April 2, 2011 || Mount Lemmon || Mount Lemmon Survey ||  || align=right | 3.2 km || 
|-id=051 bgcolor=#E9E9E9
| 600051 ||  || — || November 1, 2013 || Mount Lemmon || Mount Lemmon Survey ||  || align=right data-sort-value="0.92" | 920 m || 
|-id=052 bgcolor=#fefefe
| 600052 ||  || — || March 22, 2015 || Haleakala || Pan-STARRS ||  || align=right data-sort-value="0.65" | 650 m || 
|-id=053 bgcolor=#E9E9E9
| 600053 ||  || — || March 27, 2011 || Mount Lemmon || Mount Lemmon Survey ||  || align=right data-sort-value="0.77" | 770 m || 
|-id=054 bgcolor=#E9E9E9
| 600054 ||  || — || March 28, 2011 || Catalina || CSS ||  || align=right | 1.6 km || 
|-id=055 bgcolor=#E9E9E9
| 600055 ||  || — || April 1, 2011 || Kitt Peak || Spacewatch ||  || align=right data-sort-value="0.97" | 970 m || 
|-id=056 bgcolor=#fefefe
| 600056 ||  || — || August 27, 2001 || Kitt Peak || Spacewatch ||  || align=right data-sort-value="0.87" | 870 m || 
|-id=057 bgcolor=#E9E9E9
| 600057 ||  || — || April 2, 2011 || Mount Lemmon || Mount Lemmon Survey ||  || align=right | 1.1 km || 
|-id=058 bgcolor=#d6d6d6
| 600058 ||  || — || April 2, 2011 || Mount Lemmon || Mount Lemmon Survey ||  || align=right | 2.8 km || 
|-id=059 bgcolor=#d6d6d6
| 600059 ||  || — || April 1, 2011 || Mount Lemmon || Mount Lemmon Survey ||  || align=right | 2.0 km || 
|-id=060 bgcolor=#E9E9E9
| 600060 ||  || — || April 1, 2011 || Mount Lemmon || Mount Lemmon Survey ||  || align=right data-sort-value="0.75" | 750 m || 
|-id=061 bgcolor=#fefefe
| 600061 ||  || — || April 1, 2011 || Mount Lemmon || Mount Lemmon Survey ||  || align=right | 1.0 km || 
|-id=062 bgcolor=#E9E9E9
| 600062 ||  || — || September 5, 2008 || Kitt Peak || Spacewatch ||  || align=right data-sort-value="0.75" | 750 m || 
|-id=063 bgcolor=#fefefe
| 600063 ||  || — || July 30, 2008 || Mount Lemmon || Mount Lemmon Survey ||  || align=right data-sort-value="0.69" | 690 m || 
|-id=064 bgcolor=#E9E9E9
| 600064 ||  || — || April 2, 2011 || Mount Lemmon || Mount Lemmon Survey ||  || align=right data-sort-value="0.72" | 720 m || 
|-id=065 bgcolor=#E9E9E9
| 600065 ||  || — || April 4, 2011 || Mount Lemmon || Mount Lemmon Survey ||  || align=right | 1.7 km || 
|-id=066 bgcolor=#fefefe
| 600066 ||  || — || April 4, 2011 || Kitt Peak || Spacewatch ||  || align=right data-sort-value="0.71" | 710 m || 
|-id=067 bgcolor=#fefefe
| 600067 ||  || — || March 29, 2011 || Mount Lemmon || Mount Lemmon Survey ||  || align=right data-sort-value="0.51" | 510 m || 
|-id=068 bgcolor=#fefefe
| 600068 ||  || — || April 13, 2011 || Haleakala || Pan-STARRS ||  || align=right | 1.00 km || 
|-id=069 bgcolor=#fefefe
| 600069 ||  || — || September 18, 2009 || Kitt Peak || Spacewatch || H || align=right data-sort-value="0.60" | 600 m || 
|-id=070 bgcolor=#E9E9E9
| 600070 ||  || — || April 2, 2011 || Kitt Peak || Spacewatch ||  || align=right data-sort-value="0.96" | 960 m || 
|-id=071 bgcolor=#fefefe
| 600071 ||  || — || April 4, 2011 || Kitt Peak || Spacewatch || H || align=right data-sort-value="0.51" | 510 m || 
|-id=072 bgcolor=#E9E9E9
| 600072 ||  || — || April 2, 2011 || Haleakala || Pan-STARRS ||  || align=right | 1.8 km || 
|-id=073 bgcolor=#E9E9E9
| 600073 ||  || — || March 1, 2011 || Mount Lemmon || Mount Lemmon Survey ||  || align=right data-sort-value="0.76" | 760 m || 
|-id=074 bgcolor=#fefefe
| 600074 ||  || — || October 16, 2009 || Mount Lemmon || Mount Lemmon Survey ||  || align=right data-sort-value="0.56" | 560 m || 
|-id=075 bgcolor=#E9E9E9
| 600075 ||  || — || April 6, 2011 || Mount Lemmon || Mount Lemmon Survey ||  || align=right | 1.5 km || 
|-id=076 bgcolor=#fefefe
| 600076 ||  || — || March 21, 2015 || Haleakala || Pan-STARRS ||  || align=right data-sort-value="0.75" | 750 m || 
|-id=077 bgcolor=#E9E9E9
| 600077 ||  || — || April 5, 2011 || Kitt Peak || Spacewatch ||  || align=right | 1.3 km || 
|-id=078 bgcolor=#E9E9E9
| 600078 ||  || — || March 16, 2015 || Haleakala || Pan-STARRS ||  || align=right data-sort-value="0.79" | 790 m || 
|-id=079 bgcolor=#E9E9E9
| 600079 ||  || — || April 2, 2011 || Kitt Peak || Spacewatch ||  || align=right data-sort-value="0.69" | 690 m || 
|-id=080 bgcolor=#E9E9E9
| 600080 ||  || — || April 5, 2011 || Kitt Peak || Spacewatch ||  || align=right | 1.3 km || 
|-id=081 bgcolor=#E9E9E9
| 600081 ||  || — || April 4, 2011 || Kitt Peak || Spacewatch ||  || align=right | 1.1 km || 
|-id=082 bgcolor=#E9E9E9
| 600082 ||  || — || April 13, 2011 || Kitt Peak || Spacewatch ||  || align=right | 1.5 km || 
|-id=083 bgcolor=#E9E9E9
| 600083 ||  || — || April 3, 2011 || Haleakala || Pan-STARRS ||  || align=right data-sort-value="0.74" | 740 m || 
|-id=084 bgcolor=#d6d6d6
| 600084 ||  || — || April 25, 2011 || Mount Lemmon || Mount Lemmon Survey || Tj (2.99) || align=right | 3.0 km || 
|-id=085 bgcolor=#E9E9E9
| 600085 ||  || — || April 24, 2011 || Kitt Peak || Spacewatch ||  || align=right | 1.6 km || 
|-id=086 bgcolor=#fefefe
| 600086 ||  || — || February 25, 2007 || Mount Lemmon || Mount Lemmon Survey ||  || align=right data-sort-value="0.72" | 720 m || 
|-id=087 bgcolor=#E9E9E9
| 600087 ||  || — || September 2, 2008 || Kitt Peak || Spacewatch ||  || align=right | 1.3 km || 
|-id=088 bgcolor=#E9E9E9
| 600088 ||  || — || April 6, 2011 || Mount Lemmon || Mount Lemmon Survey ||  || align=right data-sort-value="0.96" | 960 m || 
|-id=089 bgcolor=#E9E9E9
| 600089 ||  || — || April 23, 2011 || Haleakala || Pan-STARRS ||  || align=right data-sort-value="0.82" | 820 m || 
|-id=090 bgcolor=#d6d6d6
| 600090 ||  || — || October 27, 2008 || Kitt Peak || Spacewatch ||  || align=right | 3.2 km || 
|-id=091 bgcolor=#E9E9E9
| 600091 ||  || — || April 6, 2011 || Mount Lemmon || Mount Lemmon Survey ||  || align=right | 1.3 km || 
|-id=092 bgcolor=#E9E9E9
| 600092 ||  || — || April 23, 2011 || Kitt Peak || Spacewatch ||  || align=right data-sort-value="0.69" | 690 m || 
|-id=093 bgcolor=#E9E9E9
| 600093 ||  || — || April 28, 2011 || Haleakala || Pan-STARRS ||  || align=right | 1.1 km || 
|-id=094 bgcolor=#E9E9E9
| 600094 ||  || — || December 28, 2005 || Kitt Peak || Spacewatch ||  || align=right | 1.4 km || 
|-id=095 bgcolor=#E9E9E9
| 600095 ||  || — || April 23, 2011 || Haleakala || Pan-STARRS ||  || align=right data-sort-value="0.75" | 750 m || 
|-id=096 bgcolor=#E9E9E9
| 600096 ||  || — || April 6, 2011 || Mount Lemmon || Mount Lemmon Survey ||  || align=right data-sort-value="0.96" | 960 m || 
|-id=097 bgcolor=#E9E9E9
| 600097 ||  || — || April 22, 2011 || Kitt Peak || Spacewatch ||  || align=right | 1.5 km || 
|-id=098 bgcolor=#fefefe
| 600098 ||  || — || March 26, 2011 || Kitt Peak || Spacewatch ||  || align=right data-sort-value="0.63" | 630 m || 
|-id=099 bgcolor=#E9E9E9
| 600099 ||  || — || April 11, 2011 || Mount Lemmon || Mount Lemmon Survey ||  || align=right data-sort-value="0.66" | 660 m || 
|-id=100 bgcolor=#E9E9E9
| 600100 ||  || — || November 17, 2009 || Mount Lemmon || Mount Lemmon Survey ||  || align=right data-sort-value="0.67" | 670 m || 
|}

600101–600200 

|-bgcolor=#E9E9E9
| 600101 ||  || — || January 30, 2011 || Haleakala || Pan-STARRS ||  || align=right data-sort-value="0.85" | 850 m || 
|-id=102 bgcolor=#E9E9E9
| 600102 ||  || — || September 6, 2008 || Mount Lemmon || Mount Lemmon Survey ||  || align=right | 1.7 km || 
|-id=103 bgcolor=#fefefe
| 600103 ||  || — || January 22, 2015 || Haleakala || Pan-STARRS ||  || align=right data-sort-value="0.69" | 690 m || 
|-id=104 bgcolor=#E9E9E9
| 600104 ||  || — || April 27, 2011 || Mount Lemmon || Mount Lemmon Survey ||  || align=right | 1.3 km || 
|-id=105 bgcolor=#fefefe
| 600105 ||  || — || April 30, 2011 || Mount Lemmon || Mount Lemmon Survey ||  || align=right data-sort-value="0.57" | 570 m || 
|-id=106 bgcolor=#fefefe
| 600106 ||  || — || October 19, 2012 || Haleakala || Pan-STARRS || H || align=right data-sort-value="0.48" | 480 m || 
|-id=107 bgcolor=#E9E9E9
| 600107 ||  || — || April 26, 2011 || Kitt Peak || Spacewatch ||  || align=right | 1.3 km || 
|-id=108 bgcolor=#d6d6d6
| 600108 ||  || — || May 25, 2006 || Mauna Kea || Mauna Kea Obs. || Tj (2.98) || align=right | 3.4 km || 
|-id=109 bgcolor=#E9E9E9
| 600109 ||  || — || May 4, 2011 || Dauban || C. Rinner, F. Kugel ||  || align=right | 1.8 km || 
|-id=110 bgcolor=#E9E9E9
| 600110 ||  || — || March 25, 2007 || Mount Lemmon || Mount Lemmon Survey ||  || align=right data-sort-value="0.81" | 810 m || 
|-id=111 bgcolor=#E9E9E9
| 600111 ||  || — || May 16, 2007 || Mount Lemmon || Mount Lemmon Survey ||  || align=right | 1.0 km || 
|-id=112 bgcolor=#E9E9E9
| 600112 ||  || — || May 1, 2011 || Haleakala || Pan-STARRS ||  || align=right | 1.5 km || 
|-id=113 bgcolor=#fefefe
| 600113 ||  || — || February 26, 2007 || Mount Lemmon || Mount Lemmon Survey ||  || align=right data-sort-value="0.91" | 910 m || 
|-id=114 bgcolor=#E9E9E9
| 600114 ||  || — || May 1, 2011 || Haleakala || Pan-STARRS ||  || align=right | 1.1 km || 
|-id=115 bgcolor=#fefefe
| 600115 ||  || — || May 6, 2011 || Kitt Peak || Spacewatch ||  || align=right data-sort-value="0.79" | 790 m || 
|-id=116 bgcolor=#E9E9E9
| 600116 ||  || — || December 13, 2013 || Mount Lemmon || Mount Lemmon Survey ||  || align=right | 1.4 km || 
|-id=117 bgcolor=#E9E9E9
| 600117 ||  || — || May 21, 2011 || Mount Lemmon || Mount Lemmon Survey ||  || align=right data-sort-value="0.64" | 640 m || 
|-id=118 bgcolor=#fefefe
| 600118 ||  || — || May 24, 2011 || Mount Lemmon || Mount Lemmon Survey || H || align=right data-sort-value="0.58" | 580 m || 
|-id=119 bgcolor=#FA8072
| 600119 ||  || — || May 29, 2011 || Nogales || M. Schwartz, P. R. Holvorcem ||  || align=right data-sort-value="0.66" | 660 m || 
|-id=120 bgcolor=#E9E9E9
| 600120 ||  || — || February 27, 2006 || Mount Lemmon || Mount Lemmon Survey ||  || align=right | 1.5 km || 
|-id=121 bgcolor=#E9E9E9
| 600121 ||  || — || May 3, 2011 || Mount Lemmon || Mount Lemmon Survey ||  || align=right | 1.2 km || 
|-id=122 bgcolor=#E9E9E9
| 600122 ||  || — || May 11, 2011 || Nogales || M. Schwartz, P. R. Holvorcem || JUN || align=right data-sort-value="0.99" | 990 m || 
|-id=123 bgcolor=#E9E9E9
| 600123 ||  || — || May 29, 2011 || Mount Lemmon || Mount Lemmon Survey ||  || align=right data-sort-value="0.83" | 830 m || 
|-id=124 bgcolor=#E9E9E9
| 600124 ||  || — || May 21, 2011 || Haleakala || Pan-STARRS ||  || align=right | 1.5 km || 
|-id=125 bgcolor=#E9E9E9
| 600125 ||  || — || May 23, 2011 || Nogales || M. Schwartz, P. R. Holvorcem ||  || align=right | 1.3 km || 
|-id=126 bgcolor=#fefefe
| 600126 ||  || — || July 12, 2005 || Mount Lemmon || Mount Lemmon Survey ||  || align=right data-sort-value="0.64" | 640 m || 
|-id=127 bgcolor=#E9E9E9
| 600127 ||  || — || March 20, 2002 || Palomar || NEAT ||  || align=right | 1.9 km || 
|-id=128 bgcolor=#d6d6d6
| 600128 ||  || — || May 24, 2011 || Haleakala || Pan-STARRS || 3:2 || align=right | 3.4 km || 
|-id=129 bgcolor=#d6d6d6
| 600129 ||  || — || May 24, 2011 || Haleakala || Pan-STARRS || 3:2 || align=right | 3.2 km || 
|-id=130 bgcolor=#fefefe
| 600130 ||  || — || February 21, 2007 || Mount Lemmon || Mount Lemmon Survey ||  || align=right data-sort-value="0.72" | 720 m || 
|-id=131 bgcolor=#E9E9E9
| 600131 ||  || — || April 10, 2002 || Palomar || NEAT ||  || align=right | 2.8 km || 
|-id=132 bgcolor=#E9E9E9
| 600132 ||  || — || May 30, 2011 || Haleakala || Pan-STARRS ||  || align=right | 1.0 km || 
|-id=133 bgcolor=#E9E9E9
| 600133 ||  || — || March 30, 2015 || Haleakala || Pan-STARRS ||  || align=right data-sort-value="0.98" | 980 m || 
|-id=134 bgcolor=#E9E9E9
| 600134 ||  || — || May 27, 2011 || Nogales || M. Schwartz, P. R. Holvorcem ||  || align=right data-sort-value="0.96" | 960 m || 
|-id=135 bgcolor=#E9E9E9
| 600135 ||  || — || April 14, 2015 || Mount Lemmon || Mount Lemmon Survey ||  || align=right data-sort-value="0.68" | 680 m || 
|-id=136 bgcolor=#E9E9E9
| 600136 ||  || — || May 21, 2011 || Mount Lemmon || Mount Lemmon Survey ||  || align=right data-sort-value="0.77" | 770 m || 
|-id=137 bgcolor=#E9E9E9
| 600137 ||  || — || May 22, 2011 || Mount Lemmon || Mount Lemmon Survey ||  || align=right data-sort-value="0.74" | 740 m || 
|-id=138 bgcolor=#E9E9E9
| 600138 ||  || — || May 26, 2011 || Mount Lemmon || Mount Lemmon Survey ||  || align=right | 1.6 km || 
|-id=139 bgcolor=#E9E9E9
| 600139 ||  || — || May 26, 2011 || Mount Lemmon || Mount Lemmon Survey ||  || align=right data-sort-value="0.81" | 810 m || 
|-id=140 bgcolor=#E9E9E9
| 600140 ||  || — || May 24, 2011 || Haleakala || Pan-STARRS ||  || align=right | 1.2 km || 
|-id=141 bgcolor=#E9E9E9
| 600141 ||  || — || June 1, 2011 || Bergisch Gladbach || W. Bickel ||  || align=right | 1.2 km || 
|-id=142 bgcolor=#E9E9E9
| 600142 ||  || — || June 3, 2011 || Catalina || CSS ||  || align=right | 1.3 km || 
|-id=143 bgcolor=#E9E9E9
| 600143 ||  || — || September 14, 2007 || Mount Lemmon || Mount Lemmon Survey ||  || align=right | 1.2 km || 
|-id=144 bgcolor=#E9E9E9
| 600144 ||  || — || December 14, 2001 || Kitt Peak || Spacewatch ||  || align=right data-sort-value="0.82" | 820 m || 
|-id=145 bgcolor=#E9E9E9
| 600145 ||  || — || May 22, 2011 || Kitt Peak || Spacewatch ||  || align=right | 1.4 km || 
|-id=146 bgcolor=#fefefe
| 600146 ||  || — || May 27, 2011 || Kitt Peak || Spacewatch || H || align=right data-sort-value="0.59" | 590 m || 
|-id=147 bgcolor=#E9E9E9
| 600147 ||  || — || June 6, 2011 || Haleakala || Pan-STARRS ||  || align=right | 1.2 km || 
|-id=148 bgcolor=#E9E9E9
| 600148 ||  || — || June 5, 2011 || Mount Lemmon || Mount Lemmon Survey ||  || align=right | 1.8 km || 
|-id=149 bgcolor=#E9E9E9
| 600149 ||  || — || June 5, 2011 || Mount Lemmon || Mount Lemmon Survey ||  || align=right data-sort-value="0.64" | 640 m || 
|-id=150 bgcolor=#E9E9E9
| 600150 ||  || — || June 8, 2011 || Haleakala || Pan-STARRS ||  || align=right | 1.3 km || 
|-id=151 bgcolor=#d6d6d6
| 600151 ||  || — || October 3, 2013 || Haleakala || Pan-STARRS || 3:2 || align=right | 4.0 km || 
|-id=152 bgcolor=#d6d6d6
| 600152 ||  || — || June 6, 2011 || Mount Lemmon || Mount Lemmon Survey || 3:2 || align=right | 3.7 km || 
|-id=153 bgcolor=#E9E9E9
| 600153 ||  || — || June 11, 2011 || Haleakala || Pan-STARRS ||  || align=right | 2.2 km || 
|-id=154 bgcolor=#E9E9E9
| 600154 ||  || — || June 28, 2011 || Mount Lemmon || Mount Lemmon Survey ||  || align=right | 1.2 km || 
|-id=155 bgcolor=#d6d6d6
| 600155 ||  || — || May 30, 2011 || Haleakala || Pan-STARRS ||  || align=right | 3.1 km || 
|-id=156 bgcolor=#E9E9E9
| 600156 ||  || — || June 24, 2011 || Kitt Peak || Spacewatch ||  || align=right | 1.8 km || 
|-id=157 bgcolor=#E9E9E9
| 600157 ||  || — || June 25, 2011 || Kitt Peak || Spacewatch ||  || align=right | 1.3 km || 
|-id=158 bgcolor=#E9E9E9
| 600158 ||  || — || July 13, 2011 || Haleakala || Pan-STARRS ||  || align=right | 1.3 km || 
|-id=159 bgcolor=#E9E9E9
| 600159 ||  || — || June 3, 2011 || Mount Lemmon || Mount Lemmon Survey ||  || align=right data-sort-value="0.93" | 930 m || 
|-id=160 bgcolor=#E9E9E9
| 600160 ||  || — || June 27, 2011 || Mount Lemmon || Mount Lemmon Survey ||  || align=right | 2.1 km || 
|-id=161 bgcolor=#E9E9E9
| 600161 ||  || — || March 4, 2010 || Catalina || CSS ||  || align=right | 1.5 km || 
|-id=162 bgcolor=#E9E9E9
| 600162 ||  || — || July 25, 2011 || Haleakala || Pan-STARRS ||  || align=right | 1.5 km || 
|-id=163 bgcolor=#E9E9E9
| 600163 ||  || — || July 25, 2011 || Haleakala || Pan-STARRS ||  || align=right | 1.3 km || 
|-id=164 bgcolor=#E9E9E9
| 600164 ||  || — || June 24, 2011 || Kitt Peak || Spacewatch ||  || align=right | 1.0 km || 
|-id=165 bgcolor=#d6d6d6
| 600165 ||  || — || July 25, 2011 || Haleakala || Pan-STARRS ||  || align=right | 2.5 km || 
|-id=166 bgcolor=#E9E9E9
| 600166 ||  || — || October 5, 2003 || Kitt Peak || Spacewatch ||  || align=right data-sort-value="0.95" | 950 m || 
|-id=167 bgcolor=#E9E9E9
| 600167 ||  || — || July 28, 2011 || Siding Spring || SSS ||  || align=right | 1.3 km || 
|-id=168 bgcolor=#d6d6d6
| 600168 ||  || — || June 11, 2011 || Mount Lemmon || Mount Lemmon Survey ||  || align=right | 2.6 km || 
|-id=169 bgcolor=#fefefe
| 600169 ||  || — || July 28, 2011 || Haleakala || Pan-STARRS || H || align=right data-sort-value="0.76" | 760 m || 
|-id=170 bgcolor=#E9E9E9
| 600170 ||  || — || July 26, 2011 || Haleakala || Pan-STARRS ||  || align=right | 1.6 km || 
|-id=171 bgcolor=#E9E9E9
| 600171 ||  || — || May 29, 2015 || Haleakala || Pan-STARRS ||  || align=right | 1.6 km || 
|-id=172 bgcolor=#d6d6d6
| 600172 ||  || — || April 10, 2010 || Mount Lemmon || Mount Lemmon Survey ||  || align=right | 2.0 km || 
|-id=173 bgcolor=#E9E9E9
| 600173 ||  || — || September 15, 2007 || Mount Lemmon || Mount Lemmon Survey ||  || align=right | 1.9 km || 
|-id=174 bgcolor=#E9E9E9
| 600174 ||  || — || February 9, 2005 || Kitt Peak || Spacewatch ||  || align=right | 1.9 km || 
|-id=175 bgcolor=#E9E9E9
| 600175 ||  || — || March 9, 2005 || Mount Lemmon || Mount Lemmon Survey ||  || align=right | 1.9 km || 
|-id=176 bgcolor=#E9E9E9
| 600176 ||  || — || July 28, 2011 || Haleakala || Pan-STARRS ||  || align=right | 2.0 km || 
|-id=177 bgcolor=#E9E9E9
| 600177 ||  || — || July 28, 2011 || Haleakala || Pan-STARRS ||  || align=right | 1.3 km || 
|-id=178 bgcolor=#E9E9E9
| 600178 ||  || — || July 29, 2011 || Siding Spring || SSS ||  || align=right | 1.9 km || 
|-id=179 bgcolor=#E9E9E9
| 600179 ||  || — || July 1, 2011 || Mount Lemmon || Mount Lemmon Survey ||  || align=right | 1.4 km || 
|-id=180 bgcolor=#E9E9E9
| 600180 ||  || — || July 27, 2011 || Haleakala || Pan-STARRS ||  || align=right | 1.3 km || 
|-id=181 bgcolor=#C2E0FF
| 600181 ||  || — || July 26, 2011 || Haleakala || Pan-STARRS || cubewano (cold)critical || align=right | 230 km || 
|-id=182 bgcolor=#d6d6d6
| 600182 ||  || — || September 16, 2017 || Haleakala || Pan-STARRS ||  || align=right | 2.0 km || 
|-id=183 bgcolor=#E9E9E9
| 600183 ||  || — || October 10, 2012 || Haleakala || Pan-STARRS ||  || align=right | 2.3 km || 
|-id=184 bgcolor=#E9E9E9
| 600184 ||  || — || July 26, 2011 || Haleakala || Pan-STARRS ||  || align=right | 1.7 km || 
|-id=185 bgcolor=#E9E9E9
| 600185 ||  || — || November 13, 2012 || Mount Lemmon || Mount Lemmon Survey ||  || align=right | 1.5 km || 
|-id=186 bgcolor=#E9E9E9
| 600186 ||  || — || July 28, 2011 || Haleakala || Pan-STARRS ||  || align=right | 1.6 km || 
|-id=187 bgcolor=#E9E9E9
| 600187 ||  || — || September 14, 1998 || Kitt Peak || Spacewatch || ADE || align=right | 1.1 km || 
|-id=188 bgcolor=#fefefe
| 600188 ||  || — || August 6, 2011 || Haleakala || Pan-STARRS ||  || align=right data-sort-value="0.45" | 450 m || 
|-id=189 bgcolor=#d6d6d6
| 600189 ||  || — || June 29, 2011 || Kitt Peak || Spacewatch ||  || align=right | 2.7 km || 
|-id=190 bgcolor=#E9E9E9
| 600190 ||  || — || August 3, 2011 || Haleakala || Pan-STARRS ||  || align=right data-sort-value="0.91" | 910 m || 
|-id=191 bgcolor=#E9E9E9
| 600191 ||  || — || August 3, 2011 || Haleakala || Pan-STARRS ||  || align=right | 1.5 km || 
|-id=192 bgcolor=#d6d6d6
| 600192 ||  || — || August 21, 2011 || Haleakala || Pan-STARRS || TIR || align=right | 2.5 km || 
|-id=193 bgcolor=#E9E9E9
| 600193 ||  || — || August 2, 2011 || Haleakala || Pan-STARRS ||  || align=right | 2.2 km || 
|-id=194 bgcolor=#fefefe
| 600194 ||  || — || July 29, 2011 || Charleston || R. Holmes || H || align=right data-sort-value="0.48" | 480 m || 
|-id=195 bgcolor=#E9E9E9
| 600195 ||  || — || August 22, 2003 || Palomar || NEAT ||  || align=right | 1.7 km || 
|-id=196 bgcolor=#E9E9E9
| 600196 ||  || — || September 20, 2003 || Palomar || NEAT ||  || align=right data-sort-value="0.94" | 940 m || 
|-id=197 bgcolor=#E9E9E9
| 600197 ||  || — || September 12, 2002 || Palomar || NEAT ||  || align=right | 2.3 km || 
|-id=198 bgcolor=#E9E9E9
| 600198 ||  || — || October 16, 2007 || Catalina || CSS || JUN || align=right data-sort-value="0.99" | 990 m || 
|-id=199 bgcolor=#E9E9E9
| 600199 ||  || — || August 4, 2011 || La Sagra || OAM Obs. ||  || align=right | 1.3 km || 
|-id=200 bgcolor=#E9E9E9
| 600200 ||  || — || August 25, 2011 || La Sagra || OAM Obs. ||  || align=right | 1.6 km || 
|}

600201–600300 

|-bgcolor=#FA8072
| 600201 ||  || — || August 21, 2006 || Kitt Peak || Spacewatch ||  || align=right data-sort-value="0.41" | 410 m || 
|-id=202 bgcolor=#E9E9E9
| 600202 ||  || — || August 3, 2011 || Haleakala || Pan-STARRS ||  || align=right | 1.8 km || 
|-id=203 bgcolor=#fefefe
| 600203 ||  || — || August 29, 2011 || Siding Spring || SSS ||  || align=right data-sort-value="0.51" | 510 m || 
|-id=204 bgcolor=#E9E9E9
| 600204 ||  || — || August 24, 2011 || Haleakala || Pan-STARRS ||  || align=right data-sort-value="0.74" | 740 m || 
|-id=205 bgcolor=#E9E9E9
| 600205 ||  || — || April 7, 2006 || Kitt Peak || Spacewatch ||  || align=right | 1.2 km || 
|-id=206 bgcolor=#E9E9E9
| 600206 ||  || — || August 26, 2011 || Haleakala || Pan-STARRS ||  || align=right | 1.7 km || 
|-id=207 bgcolor=#C2FFFF
| 600207 ||  || — || August 31, 2011 || Haleakala || Pan-STARRS || L5 || align=right | 8.1 km || 
|-id=208 bgcolor=#E9E9E9
| 600208 ||  || — || August 31, 2011 || Haleakala || Pan-STARRS ||  || align=right | 1.8 km || 
|-id=209 bgcolor=#fefefe
| 600209 ||  || — || August 24, 2011 || Haleakala || Pan-STARRS ||  || align=right | 1.1 km || 
|-id=210 bgcolor=#E9E9E9
| 600210 ||  || — || April 5, 2002 || Palomar || NEAT ||  || align=right | 1.4 km || 
|-id=211 bgcolor=#E9E9E9
| 600211 ||  || — || August 20, 2011 || Charleston || R. Holmes ||  || align=right | 1.7 km || 
|-id=212 bgcolor=#E9E9E9
| 600212 ||  || — || August 20, 2011 || Haleakala || Pan-STARRS ||  || align=right | 1.7 km || 
|-id=213 bgcolor=#E9E9E9
| 600213 ||  || — || August 23, 2011 || Haleakala || Pan-STARRS ||  || align=right | 1.5 km || 
|-id=214 bgcolor=#E9E9E9
| 600214 ||  || — || October 11, 2007 || Mount Lemmon || Mount Lemmon Survey ||  || align=right | 1.1 km || 
|-id=215 bgcolor=#E9E9E9
| 600215 ||  || — || July 28, 2011 || Haleakala || Pan-STARRS ||  || align=right | 2.0 km || 
|-id=216 bgcolor=#E9E9E9
| 600216 ||  || — || December 29, 2008 || Kitt Peak || Spacewatch ||  || align=right | 2.1 km || 
|-id=217 bgcolor=#C2E0FF
| 600217 ||  || — || October 9, 2010 || Haleakala || Pan-STARRS || centaurcritical || align=right | 101 km || 
|-id=218 bgcolor=#E9E9E9
| 600218 ||  || — || September 27, 2016 || Haleakala || Pan-STARRS ||  || align=right | 1.8 km || 
|-id=219 bgcolor=#E9E9E9
| 600219 ||  || — || August 20, 2011 || Haleakala || Pan-STARRS ||  || align=right | 1.9 km || 
|-id=220 bgcolor=#d6d6d6
| 600220 ||  || — || October 22, 2017 || Mount Lemmon || Mount Lemmon Survey ||  || align=right | 1.7 km || 
|-id=221 bgcolor=#E9E9E9
| 600221 ||  || — || August 24, 2011 || La Sagra || OAM Obs. ||  || align=right | 1.2 km || 
|-id=222 bgcolor=#E9E9E9
| 600222 ||  || — || August 24, 2011 || Haleakala || Pan-STARRS ||  || align=right | 1.1 km || 
|-id=223 bgcolor=#d6d6d6
| 600223 ||  || — || August 24, 2011 || Haleakala || Pan-STARRS ||  || align=right | 2.6 km || 
|-id=224 bgcolor=#E9E9E9
| 600224 ||  || — || November 18, 2007 || Kitt Peak || Spacewatch ||  || align=right | 1.7 km || 
|-id=225 bgcolor=#E9E9E9
| 600225 ||  || — || September 6, 2011 || Haleakala || Pan-STARRS ||  || align=right | 1.2 km || 
|-id=226 bgcolor=#E9E9E9
| 600226 ||  || — || September 15, 2002 || Palomar || NEAT ||  || align=right | 2.3 km || 
|-id=227 bgcolor=#E9E9E9
| 600227 ||  || — || September 25, 1998 || Kitt Peak || Spacewatch ||  || align=right | 1.3 km || 
|-id=228 bgcolor=#E9E9E9
| 600228 ||  || — || May 31, 2006 || Mount Lemmon || Mount Lemmon Survey ||  || align=right | 1.2 km || 
|-id=229 bgcolor=#d6d6d6
| 600229 ||  || — || January 14, 2008 || Kitt Peak || Spacewatch || THM || align=right | 2.0 km || 
|-id=230 bgcolor=#d6d6d6
| 600230 ||  || — || March 29, 2014 || Mount Lemmon || Mount Lemmon Survey ||  || align=right | 2.1 km || 
|-id=231 bgcolor=#E9E9E9
| 600231 ||  || — || September 4, 2011 || Haleakala || Pan-STARRS ||  || align=right | 1.8 km || 
|-id=232 bgcolor=#E9E9E9
| 600232 ||  || — || September 8, 2011 || Kitt Peak || Spacewatch ||  || align=right | 1.6 km || 
|-id=233 bgcolor=#d6d6d6
| 600233 ||  || — || September 8, 2011 || Kitt Peak || Spacewatch ||  || align=right | 2.0 km || 
|-id=234 bgcolor=#d6d6d6
| 600234 ||  || — || September 4, 2011 || Haleakala || Pan-STARRS ||  || align=right | 1.9 km || 
|-id=235 bgcolor=#d6d6d6
| 600235 ||  || — || September 4, 2011 || Haleakala || Pan-STARRS ||  || align=right | 1.6 km || 
|-id=236 bgcolor=#d6d6d6
| 600236 ||  || — || September 19, 2011 || Mount Lemmon || Mount Lemmon Survey ||  || align=right | 2.4 km || 
|-id=237 bgcolor=#E9E9E9
| 600237 ||  || — || August 30, 2011 || La Sagra || OAM Obs. ||  || align=right | 1.4 km || 
|-id=238 bgcolor=#E9E9E9
| 600238 ||  || — || September 4, 2011 || Haleakala || Pan-STARRS ||  || align=right | 1.2 km || 
|-id=239 bgcolor=#d6d6d6
| 600239 ||  || — || August 27, 2000 || Cerro Tololo || R. Millis, L. H. Wasserman ||  || align=right | 2.6 km || 
|-id=240 bgcolor=#E9E9E9
| 600240 ||  || — || January 30, 2009 || Mount Lemmon || Mount Lemmon Survey ||  || align=right | 1.7 km || 
|-id=241 bgcolor=#E9E9E9
| 600241 ||  || — || October 8, 2002 || Kitt Peak || Spacewatch ||  || align=right | 1.5 km || 
|-id=242 bgcolor=#d6d6d6
| 600242 ||  || — || September 18, 2011 || Mount Lemmon || Mount Lemmon Survey ||  || align=right | 1.7 km || 
|-id=243 bgcolor=#E9E9E9
| 600243 ||  || — || May 4, 2005 || Mauna Kea || Mauna Kea Obs. || HOF || align=right | 2.1 km || 
|-id=244 bgcolor=#E9E9E9
| 600244 ||  || — || September 20, 2011 || Haleakala || Pan-STARRS ||  || align=right | 1.8 km || 
|-id=245 bgcolor=#E9E9E9
| 600245 ||  || — || May 19, 2010 || Mount Lemmon || Mount Lemmon Survey ||  || align=right | 2.2 km || 
|-id=246 bgcolor=#E9E9E9
| 600246 ||  || — || August 1, 2011 || Haleakala || Pan-STARRS ||  || align=right | 1.1 km || 
|-id=247 bgcolor=#d6d6d6
| 600247 ||  || — || September 4, 2011 || Haleakala || Pan-STARRS ||  || align=right | 2.0 km || 
|-id=248 bgcolor=#fefefe
| 600248 ||  || — || October 21, 2008 || Kitt Peak || Spacewatch ||  || align=right data-sort-value="0.50" | 500 m || 
|-id=249 bgcolor=#E9E9E9
| 600249 ||  || — || September 8, 2011 || Kitt Peak || Spacewatch ||  || align=right | 1.7 km || 
|-id=250 bgcolor=#fefefe
| 600250 ||  || — || September 19, 1998 || Apache Point || SDSS Collaboration ||  || align=right data-sort-value="0.70" | 700 m || 
|-id=251 bgcolor=#E9E9E9
| 600251 ||  || — || September 24, 2011 || Haleakala || Pan-STARRS ||  || align=right | 1.3 km || 
|-id=252 bgcolor=#d6d6d6
| 600252 ||  || — || April 28, 2000 || Kitt Peak || Spacewatch ||  || align=right | 2.3 km || 
|-id=253 bgcolor=#d6d6d6
| 600253 ||  || — || August 21, 2006 || Kitt Peak || Spacewatch ||  || align=right | 2.0 km || 
|-id=254 bgcolor=#fefefe
| 600254 ||  || — || August 29, 2011 || Mayhill-ISON || L. Elenin ||  || align=right data-sort-value="0.65" | 650 m || 
|-id=255 bgcolor=#d6d6d6
| 600255 ||  || — || August 25, 2000 || Kitt Peak || Spacewatch || TIR || align=right | 2.7 km || 
|-id=256 bgcolor=#E9E9E9
| 600256 ||  || — || January 25, 2009 || Kitt Peak || Spacewatch ||  || align=right | 2.7 km || 
|-id=257 bgcolor=#d6d6d6
| 600257 ||  || — || December 30, 2007 || Kitt Peak || Spacewatch ||  || align=right | 3.9 km || 
|-id=258 bgcolor=#E9E9E9
| 600258 ||  || — || September 27, 2002 || Palomar || NEAT ||  || align=right | 2.5 km || 
|-id=259 bgcolor=#E9E9E9
| 600259 ||  || — || March 15, 2010 || Kitt Peak || Spacewatch ||  || align=right | 1.3 km || 
|-id=260 bgcolor=#E9E9E9
| 600260 ||  || — || September 23, 2011 || Haleakala || Pan-STARRS ||  || align=right | 1.8 km || 
|-id=261 bgcolor=#E9E9E9
| 600261 ||  || — || September 23, 2011 || Kitt Peak || Spacewatch ||  || align=right | 1.6 km || 
|-id=262 bgcolor=#E9E9E9
| 600262 ||  || — || September 26, 2011 || Mount Lemmon || Mount Lemmon Survey ||  || align=right | 1.6 km || 
|-id=263 bgcolor=#d6d6d6
| 600263 ||  || — || October 19, 2006 || Kitt Peak || L. H. Wasserman || KOR || align=right | 1.3 km || 
|-id=264 bgcolor=#d6d6d6
| 600264 ||  || — || July 5, 2005 || Kitt Peak || Spacewatch ||  || align=right | 2.5 km || 
|-id=265 bgcolor=#d6d6d6
| 600265 ||  || — || September 26, 2011 || Haleakala || Pan-STARRS ||  || align=right | 1.7 km || 
|-id=266 bgcolor=#d6d6d6
| 600266 ||  || — || June 1, 2009 || Mount Lemmon || Mount Lemmon Survey ||  || align=right | 3.5 km || 
|-id=267 bgcolor=#E9E9E9
| 600267 ||  || — || September 28, 2011 || Mount Lemmon || Mount Lemmon Survey ||  || align=right | 1.6 km || 
|-id=268 bgcolor=#fefefe
| 600268 ||  || — || September 28, 2011 || Mount Lemmon || Mount Lemmon Survey ||  || align=right data-sort-value="0.73" | 730 m || 
|-id=269 bgcolor=#E9E9E9
| 600269 ||  || — || April 25, 2006 || Kitt Peak || Spacewatch ||  || align=right | 1.2 km || 
|-id=270 bgcolor=#E9E9E9
| 600270 ||  || — || August 7, 2011 || La Sagra || OAM Obs. ||  || align=right | 1.6 km || 
|-id=271 bgcolor=#E9E9E9
| 600271 ||  || — || September 18, 2011 || Mount Lemmon || Mount Lemmon Survey ||  || align=right | 1.6 km || 
|-id=272 bgcolor=#d6d6d6
| 600272 ||  || — || September 18, 2011 || Mount Lemmon || Mount Lemmon Survey ||  || align=right | 2.0 km || 
|-id=273 bgcolor=#E9E9E9
| 600273 ||  || — || September 18, 2011 || Mount Lemmon || Mount Lemmon Survey ||  || align=right | 2.3 km || 
|-id=274 bgcolor=#d6d6d6
| 600274 ||  || — || November 18, 2000 || Kitt Peak || Spacewatch ||  || align=right | 2.2 km || 
|-id=275 bgcolor=#E9E9E9
| 600275 ||  || — || October 10, 2007 || Kitt Peak || Spacewatch ||  || align=right | 1.6 km || 
|-id=276 bgcolor=#E9E9E9
| 600276 ||  || — || February 20, 2009 || Kitt Peak || Spacewatch ||  || align=right | 2.3 km || 
|-id=277 bgcolor=#E9E9E9
| 600277 ||  || — || September 7, 2011 || Kitt Peak || Spacewatch ||  || align=right | 1.7 km || 
|-id=278 bgcolor=#E9E9E9
| 600278 ||  || — || September 8, 2011 || Kitt Peak || Spacewatch ||  || align=right | 1.9 km || 
|-id=279 bgcolor=#E9E9E9
| 600279 ||  || — || June 9, 2011 || Mount Lemmon || Mount Lemmon Survey ||  || align=right | 1.2 km || 
|-id=280 bgcolor=#d6d6d6
| 600280 ||  || — || July 31, 2005 || Palomar || NEAT ||  || align=right | 2.7 km || 
|-id=281 bgcolor=#E9E9E9
| 600281 ||  || — || October 3, 2002 || Palomar || NEAT ||  || align=right | 2.6 km || 
|-id=282 bgcolor=#E9E9E9
| 600282 ||  || — || September 6, 2007 || Dauban || C. Rinner, F. Kugel ||  || align=right | 1.1 km || 
|-id=283 bgcolor=#d6d6d6
| 600283 ||  || — || November 27, 2006 || Kitt Peak || Spacewatch ||  || align=right | 2.4 km || 
|-id=284 bgcolor=#E9E9E9
| 600284 ||  || — || October 10, 2007 || Mount Lemmon || Mount Lemmon Survey ||  || align=right | 1.1 km || 
|-id=285 bgcolor=#E9E9E9
| 600285 ||  || — || November 2, 2007 || Mount Lemmon || Mount Lemmon Survey ||  || align=right | 1.3 km || 
|-id=286 bgcolor=#d6d6d6
| 600286 ||  || — || March 19, 2009 || Calar Alto || F. Hormuth ||  || align=right | 2.2 km || 
|-id=287 bgcolor=#E9E9E9
| 600287 ||  || — || September 23, 2011 || Kitt Peak || Spacewatch ||  || align=right | 2.4 km || 
|-id=288 bgcolor=#d6d6d6
| 600288 ||  || — || November 24, 2006 || Mount Lemmon || Mount Lemmon Survey ||  || align=right | 1.9 km || 
|-id=289 bgcolor=#E9E9E9
| 600289 ||  || — || March 15, 2010 || Mount Lemmon || Mount Lemmon Survey ||  || align=right | 1.9 km || 
|-id=290 bgcolor=#d6d6d6
| 600290 ||  || — || October 3, 2006 || Mount Lemmon || Mount Lemmon Survey ||  || align=right | 1.8 km || 
|-id=291 bgcolor=#E9E9E9
| 600291 ||  || — || September 8, 2011 || Kitt Peak || Spacewatch ||  || align=right | 1.8 km || 
|-id=292 bgcolor=#fefefe
| 600292 ||  || — || September 26, 2011 || Haleakala || Pan-STARRS ||  || align=right data-sort-value="0.45" | 450 m || 
|-id=293 bgcolor=#E9E9E9
| 600293 ||  || — || October 2, 2016 || Mount Lemmon || Mount Lemmon Survey ||  || align=right | 1.8 km || 
|-id=294 bgcolor=#d6d6d6
| 600294 ||  || — || September 23, 2011 || Haleakala || Pan-STARRS ||  || align=right | 2.8 km || 
|-id=295 bgcolor=#E9E9E9
| 600295 ||  || — || September 24, 2011 || Haleakala || Pan-STARRS ||  || align=right | 1.9 km || 
|-id=296 bgcolor=#E9E9E9
| 600296 ||  || — || September 24, 2011 || Haleakala || Pan-STARRS ||  || align=right | 1.7 km || 
|-id=297 bgcolor=#E9E9E9
| 600297 ||  || — || September 29, 2011 || Mount Lemmon || Mount Lemmon Survey ||  || align=right | 2.2 km || 
|-id=298 bgcolor=#d6d6d6
| 600298 ||  || — || April 30, 2014 || Haleakala || Pan-STARRS ||  || align=right | 1.6 km || 
|-id=299 bgcolor=#d6d6d6
| 600299 ||  || — || September 24, 2011 || Haleakala || Pan-STARRS ||  || align=right | 2.0 km || 
|-id=300 bgcolor=#E9E9E9
| 600300 ||  || — || September 26, 2011 || Haleakala || Pan-STARRS ||  || align=right | 1.6 km || 
|}

600301–600400 

|-bgcolor=#d6d6d6
| 600301 ||  || — || September 21, 2011 || Haleakala || Pan-STARRS ||  || align=right | 2.3 km || 
|-id=302 bgcolor=#E9E9E9
| 600302 ||  || — || September 24, 2011 || Haleakala || Pan-STARRS ||  || align=right | 1.6 km || 
|-id=303 bgcolor=#d6d6d6
| 600303 ||  || — || September 24, 2011 || Mount Lemmon || Mount Lemmon Survey ||  || align=right | 2.1 km || 
|-id=304 bgcolor=#E9E9E9
| 600304 ||  || — || September 24, 2011 || Mount Lemmon || Mount Lemmon Survey ||  || align=right | 1.0 km || 
|-id=305 bgcolor=#fefefe
| 600305 ||  || — || September 28, 2011 || Kitt Peak || Spacewatch ||  || align=right data-sort-value="0.61" | 610 m || 
|-id=306 bgcolor=#E9E9E9
| 600306 ||  || — || September 21, 2011 || Mount Lemmon || Mount Lemmon Survey ||  || align=right | 1.6 km || 
|-id=307 bgcolor=#fefefe
| 600307 ||  || — || September 19, 2011 || La Sagra || OAM Obs. || H || align=right data-sort-value="0.62" | 620 m || 
|-id=308 bgcolor=#d6d6d6
| 600308 ||  || — || September 21, 2011 || Mount Lemmon || Mount Lemmon Survey ||  || align=right | 1.8 km || 
|-id=309 bgcolor=#E9E9E9
| 600309 ||  || — || October 3, 2011 || Taunus || S. Karge, R. Kling ||  || align=right | 2.3 km || 
|-id=310 bgcolor=#E9E9E9
| 600310 ||  || — || August 18, 2006 || Palomar || NEAT ||  || align=right | 2.4 km || 
|-id=311 bgcolor=#E9E9E9
| 600311 ||  || — || April 8, 2010 || Mount Lemmon || Mount Lemmon Survey ||  || align=right | 1.4 km || 
|-id=312 bgcolor=#E9E9E9
| 600312 ||  || — || February 27, 2014 || Kitt Peak || Spacewatch ||  || align=right | 1.8 km || 
|-id=313 bgcolor=#d6d6d6
| 600313 ||  || — || October 27, 2016 || Mount Lemmon || Mount Lemmon Survey ||  || align=right | 1.9 km || 
|-id=314 bgcolor=#fefefe
| 600314 ||  || — || October 21, 2001 || Socorro || LINEAR ||  || align=right data-sort-value="0.62" | 620 m || 
|-id=315 bgcolor=#d6d6d6
| 600315 ||  || — || September 2, 2011 || Haleakala || Pan-STARRS ||  || align=right | 1.8 km || 
|-id=316 bgcolor=#E9E9E9
| 600316 ||  || — || October 18, 2011 || Mount Lemmon || Mount Lemmon Survey ||  || align=right | 1.6 km || 
|-id=317 bgcolor=#fefefe
| 600317 ||  || — || October 21, 2001 || Socorro || LINEAR ||  || align=right data-sort-value="0.61" | 610 m || 
|-id=318 bgcolor=#E9E9E9
| 600318 ||  || — || July 9, 2011 || Haleakala || Pan-STARRS ||  || align=right | 1.8 km || 
|-id=319 bgcolor=#d6d6d6
| 600319 ||  || — || October 20, 2011 || Kitt Peak || Spacewatch ||  || align=right | 2.4 km || 
|-id=320 bgcolor=#E9E9E9
| 600320 ||  || — || October 19, 2011 || Mount Lemmon || Mount Lemmon Survey ||  || align=right | 1.6 km || 
|-id=321 bgcolor=#d6d6d6
| 600321 ||  || — || November 24, 2000 || Kitt Peak || Spacewatch || LIX || align=right | 2.8 km || 
|-id=322 bgcolor=#d6d6d6
| 600322 ||  || — || October 21, 2011 || Mount Lemmon || Mount Lemmon Survey ||  || align=right | 2.2 km || 
|-id=323 bgcolor=#d6d6d6
| 600323 ||  || — || December 31, 2007 || Mount Lemmon || Mount Lemmon Survey ||  || align=right | 2.4 km || 
|-id=324 bgcolor=#E9E9E9
| 600324 ||  || — || June 5, 2010 || Nogales || M. Schwartz, P. R. Holvorcem ||  || align=right | 2.8 km || 
|-id=325 bgcolor=#d6d6d6
| 600325 ||  || — || October 2, 2006 || Mount Lemmon || Mount Lemmon Survey ||  || align=right | 2.5 km || 
|-id=326 bgcolor=#E9E9E9
| 600326 ||  || — || October 19, 2011 || Kitt Peak || Spacewatch ||  || align=right | 1.7 km || 
|-id=327 bgcolor=#E9E9E9
| 600327 ||  || — || September 1, 2002 || Palomar || NEAT ||  || align=right | 1.7 km || 
|-id=328 bgcolor=#E9E9E9
| 600328 ||  || — || October 19, 2011 || Kitt Peak || Spacewatch ||  || align=right | 1.7 km || 
|-id=329 bgcolor=#d6d6d6
| 600329 ||  || — || April 11, 2008 || Kitt Peak || Spacewatch ||  || align=right | 2.3 km || 
|-id=330 bgcolor=#E9E9E9
| 600330 ||  || — || August 29, 2006 || Kitt Peak || Spacewatch ||  || align=right | 1.9 km || 
|-id=331 bgcolor=#fefefe
| 600331 ||  || — || October 18, 2011 || Catalina || CSS || H || align=right data-sort-value="0.61" | 610 m || 
|-id=332 bgcolor=#d6d6d6
| 600332 ||  || — || October 6, 2000 || Haleakala || AMOS ||  || align=right | 3.8 km || 
|-id=333 bgcolor=#d6d6d6
| 600333 ||  || — || October 4, 2006 || Mount Lemmon || Mount Lemmon Survey ||  || align=right | 2.6 km || 
|-id=334 bgcolor=#E9E9E9
| 600334 ||  || — || September 30, 2011 || Piszkesteto || K. Sárneczky ||  || align=right | 1.3 km || 
|-id=335 bgcolor=#fefefe
| 600335 ||  || — || October 19, 2011 || Kitt Peak || Spacewatch || H || align=right data-sort-value="0.51" | 510 m || 
|-id=336 bgcolor=#E9E9E9
| 600336 ||  || — || October 23, 2003 || Apache Point || SDSS Collaboration ||  || align=right | 2.1 km || 
|-id=337 bgcolor=#d6d6d6
| 600337 ||  || — || March 23, 2003 || Apache Point || SDSS Collaboration ||  || align=right | 3.2 km || 
|-id=338 bgcolor=#d6d6d6
| 600338 ||  || — || October 25, 2011 || Haleakala || Pan-STARRS ||  || align=right | 2.2 km || 
|-id=339 bgcolor=#E9E9E9
| 600339 ||  || — || August 16, 2006 || Palomar || NEAT || TIN || align=right | 1.1 km || 
|-id=340 bgcolor=#fefefe
| 600340 ||  || — || October 8, 2011 || Charleston || R. Holmes ||  || align=right data-sort-value="0.58" | 580 m || 
|-id=341 bgcolor=#d6d6d6
| 600341 ||  || — || October 24, 2011 || Mount Lemmon || Mount Lemmon Survey ||  || align=right | 2.0 km || 
|-id=342 bgcolor=#E9E9E9
| 600342 ||  || — || October 24, 2011 || Mount Lemmon || Mount Lemmon Survey ||  || align=right | 2.2 km || 
|-id=343 bgcolor=#E9E9E9
| 600343 ||  || — || October 24, 2011 || Mount Lemmon || Mount Lemmon Survey ||  || align=right | 1.7 km || 
|-id=344 bgcolor=#d6d6d6
| 600344 ||  || — || September 21, 2011 || Kitt Peak || Spacewatch ||  || align=right | 1.8 km || 
|-id=345 bgcolor=#fefefe
| 600345 ||  || — || October 20, 2011 || Mount Lemmon || Mount Lemmon Survey ||  || align=right data-sort-value="0.67" | 670 m || 
|-id=346 bgcolor=#d6d6d6
| 600346 ||  || — || October 22, 2006 || Kitt Peak || Spacewatch ||  || align=right | 2.5 km || 
|-id=347 bgcolor=#fefefe
| 600347 ||  || — || October 24, 2011 || Mount Lemmon || Mount Lemmon Survey ||  || align=right data-sort-value="0.61" | 610 m || 
|-id=348 bgcolor=#d6d6d6
| 600348 ||  || — || July 28, 2005 || Palomar || NEAT ||  || align=right | 2.2 km || 
|-id=349 bgcolor=#E9E9E9
| 600349 ||  || — || April 15, 2010 || Kitt Peak || Spacewatch ||  || align=right | 1.5 km || 
|-id=350 bgcolor=#E9E9E9
| 600350 ||  || — || April 20, 2010 || Mount Lemmon || Mount Lemmon Survey ||  || align=right | 1.8 km || 
|-id=351 bgcolor=#E9E9E9
| 600351 ||  || — || November 9, 2007 || Kitt Peak || Spacewatch ||  || align=right | 2.1 km || 
|-id=352 bgcolor=#E9E9E9
| 600352 ||  || — || October 4, 2006 || Mount Lemmon || Mount Lemmon Survey ||  || align=right | 2.8 km || 
|-id=353 bgcolor=#d6d6d6
| 600353 ||  || — || October 24, 2011 || Kitt Peak || Spacewatch ||  || align=right | 2.8 km || 
|-id=354 bgcolor=#d6d6d6
| 600354 ||  || — || October 25, 2011 || XuYi || PMO NEO ||  || align=right | 2.2 km || 
|-id=355 bgcolor=#fefefe
| 600355 ||  || — || September 15, 2007 || Mount Lemmon || Mount Lemmon Survey ||  || align=right data-sort-value="0.79" | 790 m || 
|-id=356 bgcolor=#E9E9E9
| 600356 ||  || — || October 28, 2011 || Kitt Peak || Spacewatch ||  || align=right | 1.3 km || 
|-id=357 bgcolor=#E9E9E9
| 600357 ||  || — || October 24, 2011 || Haleakala || Pan-STARRS ||  || align=right | 1.6 km || 
|-id=358 bgcolor=#d6d6d6
| 600358 ||  || — || October 20, 2011 || Kitt Peak || Spacewatch ||  || align=right | 1.7 km || 
|-id=359 bgcolor=#d6d6d6
| 600359 ||  || — || September 10, 2005 || Anderson Mesa || LONEOS ||  || align=right | 3.8 km || 
|-id=360 bgcolor=#d6d6d6
| 600360 ||  || — || February 16, 2005 || La Silla || A. Boattini ||  || align=right | 3.1 km || 
|-id=361 bgcolor=#E9E9E9
| 600361 ||  || — || October 16, 2011 || Haleakala || Pan-STARRS ||  || align=right | 1.8 km || 
|-id=362 bgcolor=#d6d6d6
| 600362 ||  || — || November 18, 2001 || Kitt Peak || Spacewatch ||  || align=right | 2.3 km || 
|-id=363 bgcolor=#E9E9E9
| 600363 ||  || — || February 21, 2001 || Kitt Peak || Spacewatch ||  || align=right | 1.2 km || 
|-id=364 bgcolor=#fefefe
| 600364 ||  || — || September 25, 2011 || Haleakala || Pan-STARRS ||  || align=right data-sort-value="0.61" | 610 m || 
|-id=365 bgcolor=#E9E9E9
| 600365 ||  || — || September 20, 2011 || Zelenchukskaya Stn || T. V. Kryachko, B. Satovski ||  || align=right | 2.6 km || 
|-id=366 bgcolor=#d6d6d6
| 600366 ||  || — || April 1, 2003 || Apache Point || SDSS Collaboration ||  || align=right | 3.6 km || 
|-id=367 bgcolor=#d6d6d6
| 600367 ||  || — || December 20, 2007 || Kitt Peak || Spacewatch ||  || align=right | 2.2 km || 
|-id=368 bgcolor=#E9E9E9
| 600368 ||  || — || January 12, 2008 || Mount Lemmon || Mount Lemmon Survey ||  || align=right | 1.7 km || 
|-id=369 bgcolor=#E9E9E9
| 600369 ||  || — || September 29, 2011 || Kitt Peak || Spacewatch ||  || align=right | 1.6 km || 
|-id=370 bgcolor=#d6d6d6
| 600370 ||  || — || October 20, 2011 || Mount Lemmon || Mount Lemmon Survey ||  || align=right | 2.2 km || 
|-id=371 bgcolor=#E9E9E9
| 600371 ||  || — || October 21, 2011 || Kitt Peak || Spacewatch ||  || align=right | 1.3 km || 
|-id=372 bgcolor=#E9E9E9
| 600372 ||  || — || September 29, 2011 || Kitt Peak || Spacewatch ||  || align=right | 1.8 km || 
|-id=373 bgcolor=#E9E9E9
| 600373 ||  || — || November 19, 2007 || Mount Lemmon || Mount Lemmon Survey ||  || align=right | 2.1 km || 
|-id=374 bgcolor=#E9E9E9
| 600374 ||  || — || October 23, 2011 || Mount Lemmon || Mount Lemmon Survey ||  || align=right | 1.9 km || 
|-id=375 bgcolor=#d6d6d6
| 600375 ||  || — || October 24, 2011 || Mount Lemmon || Mount Lemmon Survey ||  || align=right | 2.0 km || 
|-id=376 bgcolor=#fefefe
| 600376 ||  || — || January 1, 2009 || Kitt Peak || Spacewatch ||  || align=right data-sort-value="0.71" | 710 m || 
|-id=377 bgcolor=#E9E9E9
| 600377 ||  || — || October 28, 2011 || Mount Lemmon || Mount Lemmon Survey ||  || align=right | 1.9 km || 
|-id=378 bgcolor=#d6d6d6
| 600378 ||  || — || October 30, 2011 || Mayhill-ISON || L. Elenin ||  || align=right | 2.0 km || 
|-id=379 bgcolor=#E9E9E9
| 600379 ||  || — || October 18, 2011 || Piszkesteto || A. Szing ||  || align=right data-sort-value="0.77" | 770 m || 
|-id=380 bgcolor=#d6d6d6
| 600380 ||  || — || September 20, 2011 || Kitt Peak || Spacewatch ||  || align=right | 2.0 km || 
|-id=381 bgcolor=#d6d6d6
| 600381 ||  || — || August 30, 2005 || Anderson Mesa || LONEOS || TIR || align=right | 3.6 km || 
|-id=382 bgcolor=#E9E9E9
| 600382 ||  || — || August 18, 2006 || Kitt Peak || Spacewatch ||  || align=right | 1.9 km || 
|-id=383 bgcolor=#E9E9E9
| 600383 ||  || — || September 20, 2011 || Kitt Peak || Spacewatch || TIN || align=right | 1.3 km || 
|-id=384 bgcolor=#d6d6d6
| 600384 ||  || — || October 3, 2011 || Piszkesteto || K. Sárneczky ||  || align=right | 3.0 km || 
|-id=385 bgcolor=#d6d6d6
| 600385 ||  || — || October 24, 2011 || Haleakala || Pan-STARRS ||  || align=right | 1.9 km || 
|-id=386 bgcolor=#d6d6d6
| 600386 ||  || — || October 23, 2011 || Mount Lemmon || Mount Lemmon Survey ||  || align=right | 2.1 km || 
|-id=387 bgcolor=#fefefe
| 600387 ||  || — || March 7, 2013 || Kitt Peak || Spacewatch ||  || align=right data-sort-value="0.51" | 510 m || 
|-id=388 bgcolor=#d6d6d6
| 600388 ||  || — || October 23, 2011 || Haleakala || Pan-STARRS ||  || align=right | 2.3 km || 
|-id=389 bgcolor=#d6d6d6
| 600389 ||  || — || October 19, 2011 || Haleakala || Pan-STARRS ||  || align=right | 2.0 km || 
|-id=390 bgcolor=#E9E9E9
| 600390 ||  || — || October 18, 2011 || Mount Lemmon || Mount Lemmon Survey ||  || align=right | 1.4 km || 
|-id=391 bgcolor=#d6d6d6
| 600391 ||  || — || April 10, 2014 || Haleakala || Pan-STARRS ||  || align=right | 2.1 km || 
|-id=392 bgcolor=#d6d6d6
| 600392 ||  || — || January 17, 2013 || Haleakala || Pan-STARRS ||  || align=right | 1.9 km || 
|-id=393 bgcolor=#E9E9E9
| 600393 ||  || — || October 25, 2011 || Haleakala || Pan-STARRS ||  || align=right | 1.1 km || 
|-id=394 bgcolor=#d6d6d6
| 600394 ||  || — || September 11, 2016 || Mount Lemmon || Mount Lemmon Survey ||  || align=right | 2.2 km || 
|-id=395 bgcolor=#fefefe
| 600395 ||  || — || April 11, 2013 || Kitt Peak || Spacewatch ||  || align=right data-sort-value="0.67" | 670 m || 
|-id=396 bgcolor=#E9E9E9
| 600396 ||  || — || October 26, 2011 || Haleakala || Pan-STARRS ||  || align=right | 1.7 km || 
|-id=397 bgcolor=#d6d6d6
| 600397 ||  || — || October 20, 2011 || Mount Lemmon || Mount Lemmon Survey ||  || align=right | 2.0 km || 
|-id=398 bgcolor=#d6d6d6
| 600398 ||  || — || October 23, 2011 || Haleakala || Pan-STARRS ||  || align=right | 2.6 km || 
|-id=399 bgcolor=#d6d6d6
| 600399 ||  || — || October 18, 2011 || Kitt Peak || Spacewatch ||  || align=right | 2.7 km || 
|-id=400 bgcolor=#d6d6d6
| 600400 ||  || — || October 26, 2011 || Haleakala || Pan-STARRS ||  || align=right | 2.1 km || 
|}

600401–600500 

|-bgcolor=#d6d6d6
| 600401 ||  || — || October 30, 2011 || Mount Lemmon || Mount Lemmon Survey ||  || align=right | 1.8 km || 
|-id=402 bgcolor=#d6d6d6
| 600402 ||  || — || April 28, 2014 || Mount Lemmon || Mount Lemmon Survey ||  || align=right | 1.8 km || 
|-id=403 bgcolor=#d6d6d6
| 600403 ||  || — || October 26, 2011 || Haleakala || Pan-STARRS ||  || align=right | 2.2 km || 
|-id=404 bgcolor=#d6d6d6
| 600404 ||  || — || October 23, 2011 || Mount Lemmon || Mount Lemmon Survey ||  || align=right | 2.1 km || 
|-id=405 bgcolor=#d6d6d6
| 600405 ||  || — || October 21, 2011 || Mount Lemmon || Mount Lemmon Survey ||  || align=right | 2.1 km || 
|-id=406 bgcolor=#E9E9E9
| 600406 ||  || — || October 19, 2011 || Mount Lemmon || Mount Lemmon Survey ||  || align=right | 1.6 km || 
|-id=407 bgcolor=#fefefe
| 600407 ||  || — || October 23, 2011 || Mount Lemmon || Mount Lemmon Survey ||  || align=right data-sort-value="0.61" | 610 m || 
|-id=408 bgcolor=#d6d6d6
| 600408 ||  || — || October 23, 2011 || Haleakala || Pan-STARRS ||  || align=right | 2.0 km || 
|-id=409 bgcolor=#d6d6d6
| 600409 ||  || — || October 23, 2011 || Haleakala || Pan-STARRS ||  || align=right | 1.8 km || 
|-id=410 bgcolor=#d6d6d6
| 600410 ||  || — || October 20, 2011 || Mount Lemmon || Mount Lemmon Survey ||  || align=right | 1.7 km || 
|-id=411 bgcolor=#d6d6d6
| 600411 ||  || — || October 24, 2011 || Haleakala || Pan-STARRS ||  || align=right | 2.1 km || 
|-id=412 bgcolor=#d6d6d6
| 600412 ||  || — || October 21, 2011 || Mount Lemmon || Mount Lemmon Survey ||  || align=right | 2.4 km || 
|-id=413 bgcolor=#d6d6d6
| 600413 ||  || — || October 25, 2011 || Haleakala || Pan-STARRS ||  || align=right | 2.0 km || 
|-id=414 bgcolor=#E9E9E9
| 600414 ||  || — || December 17, 2007 || Mount Lemmon || Mount Lemmon Survey ||  || align=right data-sort-value="0.92" | 920 m || 
|-id=415 bgcolor=#d6d6d6
| 600415 ||  || — || October 25, 2011 || Haleakala || Pan-STARRS ||  || align=right | 2.4 km || 
|-id=416 bgcolor=#d6d6d6
| 600416 ||  || — || September 17, 2006 || Kitt Peak || Spacewatch ||  || align=right | 1.9 km || 
|-id=417 bgcolor=#d6d6d6
| 600417 ||  || — || September 17, 2006 || Kitt Peak || Spacewatch ||  || align=right | 1.9 km || 
|-id=418 bgcolor=#fefefe
| 600418 ||  || — || October 17, 2011 || Kitt Peak || Spacewatch ||  || align=right data-sort-value="0.48" | 480 m || 
|-id=419 bgcolor=#d6d6d6
| 600419 ||  || — || November 2, 2011 || Kitt Peak || Spacewatch ||  || align=right | 2.6 km || 
|-id=420 bgcolor=#d6d6d6
| 600420 ||  || — || April 19, 2009 || Kitt Peak || Spacewatch ||  || align=right | 2.7 km || 
|-id=421 bgcolor=#d6d6d6
| 600421 ||  || — || November 1, 2011 || Kitt Peak || Spacewatch ||  || align=right | 2.1 km || 
|-id=422 bgcolor=#E9E9E9
| 600422 ||  || — || November 1, 2011 || Kitt Peak || Spacewatch ||  || align=right | 1.8 km || 
|-id=423 bgcolor=#fefefe
| 600423 ||  || — || June 30, 2000 || La Silla || La Silla Obs. ||  || align=right data-sort-value="0.64" | 640 m || 
|-id=424 bgcolor=#fefefe
| 600424 ||  || — || October 26, 2011 || Haleakala || Pan-STARRS || H || align=right data-sort-value="0.66" | 660 m || 
|-id=425 bgcolor=#E9E9E9
| 600425 ||  || — || November 16, 2011 || Mount Lemmon || Mount Lemmon Survey ||  || align=right | 1.6 km || 
|-id=426 bgcolor=#fefefe
| 600426 ||  || — || November 17, 2011 || Kitt Peak || Spacewatch ||  || align=right data-sort-value="0.56" | 560 m || 
|-id=427 bgcolor=#d6d6d6
| 600427 ||  || — || November 17, 2011 || Mount Lemmon || Mount Lemmon Survey ||  || align=right | 2.2 km || 
|-id=428 bgcolor=#d6d6d6
| 600428 ||  || — || November 17, 2011 || Mount Lemmon || Mount Lemmon Survey ||  || align=right | 2.2 km || 
|-id=429 bgcolor=#d6d6d6
| 600429 ||  || — || November 18, 2011 || Mount Lemmon || Mount Lemmon Survey ||  || align=right | 2.3 km || 
|-id=430 bgcolor=#d6d6d6
| 600430 ||  || — || October 24, 2011 || Haleakala || Pan-STARRS ||  || align=right | 1.9 km || 
|-id=431 bgcolor=#FA8072
| 600431 ||  || — || December 3, 2007 || Catalina || CSS ||  || align=right data-sort-value="0.80" | 800 m || 
|-id=432 bgcolor=#d6d6d6
| 600432 ||  || — || November 24, 2011 || Piszkesteto || G. Marton ||  || align=right | 2.1 km || 
|-id=433 bgcolor=#d6d6d6
| 600433 ||  || — || October 26, 2011 || Haleakala || Pan-STARRS ||  || align=right | 1.8 km || 
|-id=434 bgcolor=#fefefe
| 600434 ||  || — || October 30, 2011 || Mount Lemmon || Mount Lemmon Survey ||  || align=right data-sort-value="0.80" | 800 m || 
|-id=435 bgcolor=#C2FFFF
| 600435 ||  || — || November 25, 2011 || Haleakala || Pan-STARRS || L4 || align=right | 9.8 km || 
|-id=436 bgcolor=#d6d6d6
| 600436 ||  || — || November 17, 2011 || Kitt Peak || Spacewatch ||  || align=right | 3.1 km || 
|-id=437 bgcolor=#C2FFFF
| 600437 ||  || — || October 13, 2010 || Mount Lemmon || Mount Lemmon Survey || L4ERY || align=right | 7.7 km || 
|-id=438 bgcolor=#d6d6d6
| 600438 ||  || — || November 24, 2011 || Kitt Peak || Spacewatch ||  || align=right | 2.6 km || 
|-id=439 bgcolor=#fefefe
| 600439 ||  || — || November 28, 2011 || Wildberg || R. Apitzsch ||  || align=right data-sort-value="0.73" | 730 m || 
|-id=440 bgcolor=#E9E9E9
| 600440 ||  || — || October 11, 2006 || Palomar || NEAT || GEF || align=right | 1.3 km || 
|-id=441 bgcolor=#d6d6d6
| 600441 ||  || — || November 23, 2011 || Mount Lemmon || Mount Lemmon Survey ||  || align=right | 2.3 km || 
|-id=442 bgcolor=#d6d6d6
| 600442 ||  || — || November 24, 2011 || Haleakala || Pan-STARRS ||  || align=right | 2.2 km || 
|-id=443 bgcolor=#E9E9E9
| 600443 ||  || — || November 11, 2007 || Mount Lemmon || Mount Lemmon Survey ||  || align=right | 2.2 km || 
|-id=444 bgcolor=#fefefe
| 600444 ||  || — || October 26, 2011 || Haleakala || Pan-STARRS || H || align=right data-sort-value="0.58" | 580 m || 
|-id=445 bgcolor=#E9E9E9
| 600445 ||  || — || January 18, 2008 || Mount Lemmon || Mount Lemmon Survey ||  || align=right | 1.7 km || 
|-id=446 bgcolor=#d6d6d6
| 600446 ||  || — || October 25, 1995 || Kitt Peak || Spacewatch ||  || align=right | 2.3 km || 
|-id=447 bgcolor=#d6d6d6
| 600447 ||  || — || November 27, 2011 || Mount Lemmon || Mount Lemmon Survey ||  || align=right | 2.1 km || 
|-id=448 bgcolor=#fefefe
| 600448 ||  || — || November 9, 2004 || Mauna Kea || Mauna Kea Obs. ||  || align=right data-sort-value="0.64" | 640 m || 
|-id=449 bgcolor=#E9E9E9
| 600449 ||  || — || March 23, 2009 || Mount Lemmon || Mount Lemmon Survey ||  || align=right | 1.4 km || 
|-id=450 bgcolor=#E9E9E9
| 600450 ||  || — || November 18, 2011 || Mount Lemmon || Mount Lemmon Survey ||  || align=right | 2.1 km || 
|-id=451 bgcolor=#E9E9E9
| 600451 ||  || — || November 17, 2011 || Mount Lemmon || Mount Lemmon Survey ||  || align=right | 2.0 km || 
|-id=452 bgcolor=#d6d6d6
| 600452 ||  || — || November 18, 2011 || Mount Lemmon || Mount Lemmon Survey ||  || align=right | 2.9 km || 
|-id=453 bgcolor=#d6d6d6
| 600453 ||  || — || November 25, 2011 || Haleakala || Pan-STARRS ||  || align=right | 4.1 km || 
|-id=454 bgcolor=#E9E9E9
| 600454 ||  || — || September 26, 2006 || Kitt Peak || Spacewatch ||  || align=right | 2.4 km || 
|-id=455 bgcolor=#d6d6d6
| 600455 ||  || — || November 18, 2011 || Mount Lemmon || Mount Lemmon Survey ||  || align=right | 2.2 km || 
|-id=456 bgcolor=#d6d6d6
| 600456 ||  || — || October 30, 2011 || Kitt Peak || Spacewatch ||  || align=right | 2.4 km || 
|-id=457 bgcolor=#C2FFFF
| 600457 ||  || — || January 17, 2013 || Haleakala || Pan-STARRS || L4 || align=right | 7.4 km || 
|-id=458 bgcolor=#d6d6d6
| 600458 ||  || — || April 5, 2013 || Palomar || PTF ||  || align=right | 2.6 km || 
|-id=459 bgcolor=#fefefe
| 600459 ||  || — || August 29, 2014 || Kitt Peak || Spacewatch ||  || align=right data-sort-value="0.66" | 660 m || 
|-id=460 bgcolor=#d6d6d6
| 600460 ||  || — || June 5, 2014 || Haleakala || Pan-STARRS ||  || align=right | 2.5 km || 
|-id=461 bgcolor=#d6d6d6
| 600461 ||  || — || May 7, 2014 || Haleakala || Pan-STARRS ||  || align=right | 1.9 km || 
|-id=462 bgcolor=#d6d6d6
| 600462 ||  || — || August 18, 2015 || Kitt Peak || Spacewatch ||  || align=right | 2.0 km || 
|-id=463 bgcolor=#C2FFFF
| 600463 ||  || — || November 28, 2011 || Mount Lemmon || Mount Lemmon Survey || L4 || align=right | 8.8 km || 
|-id=464 bgcolor=#E9E9E9
| 600464 ||  || — || November 24, 2011 || Mount Lemmon || Mount Lemmon Survey ||  || align=right | 1.3 km || 
|-id=465 bgcolor=#d6d6d6
| 600465 ||  || — || November 18, 2011 || Mount Lemmon || Mount Lemmon Survey ||  || align=right | 2.2 km || 
|-id=466 bgcolor=#C2FFFF
| 600466 ||  || — || November 26, 2011 || Mount Lemmon || Mount Lemmon Survey || L4 || align=right | 7.8 km || 
|-id=467 bgcolor=#d6d6d6
| 600467 ||  || — || November 24, 2011 || Mount Lemmon || Mount Lemmon Survey ||  || align=right | 2.3 km || 
|-id=468 bgcolor=#E9E9E9
| 600468 ||  || — || November 18, 2011 || Mount Lemmon || Mount Lemmon Survey ||  || align=right | 2.0 km || 
|-id=469 bgcolor=#E9E9E9
| 600469 ||  || — || November 19, 2011 || Mount Lemmon || Mount Lemmon Survey ||  || align=right data-sort-value="0.74" | 740 m || 
|-id=470 bgcolor=#fefefe
| 600470 ||  || — || November 17, 2011 || Kitt Peak || Spacewatch || H || align=right data-sort-value="0.61" | 610 m || 
|-id=471 bgcolor=#d6d6d6
| 600471 ||  || — || February 3, 2013 || Haleakala || Pan-STARRS ||  || align=right | 2.2 km || 
|-id=472 bgcolor=#d6d6d6
| 600472 ||  || — || December 27, 2006 || Kitt Peak || Spacewatch ||  || align=right | 2.2 km || 
|-id=473 bgcolor=#E9E9E9
| 600473 ||  || — || September 23, 2015 || Haleakala || Pan-STARRS ||  || align=right | 1.2 km || 
|-id=474 bgcolor=#d6d6d6
| 600474 ||  || — || September 3, 2010 || Kitt Peak || Spacewatch ||  || align=right | 2.2 km || 
|-id=475 bgcolor=#d6d6d6
| 600475 ||  || — || November 22, 2011 || Mount Lemmon || Mount Lemmon Survey ||  || align=right | 2.3 km || 
|-id=476 bgcolor=#d6d6d6
| 600476 ||  || — || December 24, 2011 || Mount Lemmon || Mount Lemmon Survey ||  || align=right | 3.0 km || 
|-id=477 bgcolor=#d6d6d6
| 600477 ||  || — || November 28, 2011 || Mount Lemmon || Mount Lemmon Survey ||  || align=right | 2.9 km || 
|-id=478 bgcolor=#d6d6d6
| 600478 ||  || — || April 30, 2008 || Kitt Peak || Spacewatch ||  || align=right | 3.0 km || 
|-id=479 bgcolor=#d6d6d6
| 600479 ||  || — || December 27, 2011 || Mount Lemmon || Mount Lemmon Survey ||  || align=right | 2.7 km || 
|-id=480 bgcolor=#d6d6d6
| 600480 ||  || — || September 17, 2010 || Catalina || CSS ||  || align=right | 3.2 km || 
|-id=481 bgcolor=#fefefe
| 600481 ||  || — || December 25, 2011 || Kitt Peak || Spacewatch ||  || align=right data-sort-value="0.67" | 670 m || 
|-id=482 bgcolor=#fefefe
| 600482 ||  || — || November 22, 2011 || Mount Lemmon || Mount Lemmon Survey || H || align=right data-sort-value="0.64" | 640 m || 
|-id=483 bgcolor=#d6d6d6
| 600483 ||  || — || January 27, 2007 || Mount Lemmon || Mount Lemmon Survey ||  || align=right | 2.8 km || 
|-id=484 bgcolor=#C2FFFF
| 600484 ||  || — || December 26, 2011 || Kitt Peak || Spacewatch || L4 || align=right | 7.8 km || 
|-id=485 bgcolor=#d6d6d6
| 600485 ||  || — || December 26, 2011 || Kitt Peak || Spacewatch ||  || align=right | 2.2 km || 
|-id=486 bgcolor=#C2FFFF
| 600486 ||  || — || April 1, 2003 || Apache Point || SDSS Collaboration || L4 || align=right | 7.9 km || 
|-id=487 bgcolor=#fefefe
| 600487 ||  || — || December 24, 2011 || Mount Lemmon || Mount Lemmon Survey ||  || align=right data-sort-value="0.54" | 540 m || 
|-id=488 bgcolor=#d6d6d6
| 600488 ||  || — || September 24, 2005 || Kitt Peak || Spacewatch ||  || align=right | 2.3 km || 
|-id=489 bgcolor=#E9E9E9
| 600489 ||  || — || October 4, 2006 || Mount Lemmon || Mount Lemmon Survey ||  || align=right | 2.2 km || 
|-id=490 bgcolor=#d6d6d6
| 600490 ||  || — || September 19, 2010 || Kitt Peak || Spacewatch ||  || align=right | 2.2 km || 
|-id=491 bgcolor=#d6d6d6
| 600491 ||  || — || December 29, 2011 || Kitt Peak || Spacewatch ||  || align=right | 2.5 km || 
|-id=492 bgcolor=#C2FFFF
| 600492 ||  || — || October 1, 2008 || Mount Lemmon || Mount Lemmon Survey || L4 || align=right | 6.7 km || 
|-id=493 bgcolor=#d6d6d6
| 600493 ||  || — || February 22, 2007 || Kitt Peak || Spacewatch ||  || align=right | 2.1 km || 
|-id=494 bgcolor=#d6d6d6
| 600494 ||  || — || November 28, 2011 || Mount Lemmon || Mount Lemmon Survey ||  || align=right | 4.1 km || 
|-id=495 bgcolor=#d6d6d6
| 600495 ||  || — || November 24, 2011 || Haleakala || Pan-STARRS ||  || align=right | 2.6 km || 
|-id=496 bgcolor=#C2FFFF
| 600496 ||  || — || November 13, 2010 || Mount Lemmon || Mount Lemmon Survey || L4 || align=right | 7.2 km || 
|-id=497 bgcolor=#d6d6d6
| 600497 ||  || — || December 28, 2011 || Kitt Peak || Spacewatch ||  || align=right | 3.2 km || 
|-id=498 bgcolor=#d6d6d6
| 600498 ||  || — || March 4, 2013 || Haleakala || Pan-STARRS ||  || align=right | 2.5 km || 
|-id=499 bgcolor=#d6d6d6
| 600499 ||  || — || April 16, 2013 || Kitt Peak || Spacewatch ||  || align=right | 3.2 km || 
|-id=500 bgcolor=#d6d6d6
| 600500 ||  || — || December 25, 2011 || Kitt Peak || Spacewatch ||  || align=right | 2.3 km || 
|}

600501–600600 

|-bgcolor=#d6d6d6
| 600501 ||  || — || December 27, 2011 || Kitt Peak || Spacewatch ||  || align=right | 2.6 km || 
|-id=502 bgcolor=#d6d6d6
| 600502 ||  || — || July 19, 2015 || Haleakala || Pan-STARRS ||  || align=right | 2.7 km || 
|-id=503 bgcolor=#d6d6d6
| 600503 ||  || — || December 29, 2011 || Mount Lemmon || Mount Lemmon Survey ||  || align=right | 2.9 km || 
|-id=504 bgcolor=#d6d6d6
| 600504 ||  || — || December 27, 2011 || Catalina || CSS ||  || align=right | 2.7 km || 
|-id=505 bgcolor=#E9E9E9
| 600505 ||  || — || December 29, 2011 || Mount Lemmon || Mount Lemmon Survey ||  || align=right | 1.7 km || 
|-id=506 bgcolor=#C2FFFF
| 600506 ||  || — || December 31, 2011 || Mount Lemmon || Mount Lemmon Survey || L4 || align=right | 7.5 km || 
|-id=507 bgcolor=#C2FFFF
| 600507 ||  || — || December 29, 2011 || Mount Lemmon || Mount Lemmon Survey || L4 || align=right | 6.6 km || 
|-id=508 bgcolor=#C2FFFF
| 600508 ||  || — || December 27, 2011 || Kitt Peak || Spacewatch || L4 || align=right | 7.0 km || 
|-id=509 bgcolor=#d6d6d6
| 600509 ||  || — || December 25, 2011 || Kitt Peak || Spacewatch ||  || align=right | 2.1 km || 
|-id=510 bgcolor=#d6d6d6
| 600510 ||  || — || January 2, 2012 || Mount Lemmon || Mount Lemmon Survey ||  || align=right | 2.3 km || 
|-id=511 bgcolor=#fefefe
| 600511 ||  || — || January 1, 2012 || Mount Lemmon || Mount Lemmon Survey ||  || align=right data-sort-value="0.51" | 510 m || 
|-id=512 bgcolor=#d6d6d6
| 600512 ||  || — || January 2, 2012 || Kitt Peak || Spacewatch ||  || align=right | 3.0 km || 
|-id=513 bgcolor=#d6d6d6
| 600513 ||  || — || January 14, 2012 || Kitt Peak || Spacewatch ||  || align=right | 2.4 km || 
|-id=514 bgcolor=#d6d6d6
| 600514 ||  || — || December 7, 2005 || Kitt Peak || Spacewatch ||  || align=right | 2.2 km || 
|-id=515 bgcolor=#C2FFFF
| 600515 ||  || — || December 28, 2011 || Mount Lemmon || Mount Lemmon Survey || L4 || align=right | 7.6 km || 
|-id=516 bgcolor=#d6d6d6
| 600516 ||  || — || January 14, 2012 || Catalina || CSS ||  || align=right | 2.2 km || 
|-id=517 bgcolor=#fefefe
| 600517 ||  || — || September 19, 2003 || Palomar || NEAT ||  || align=right | 1.4 km || 
|-id=518 bgcolor=#C2FFFF
| 600518 ||  || — || January 2, 2012 || Mount Lemmon || Mount Lemmon Survey || L4 || align=right | 8.6 km || 
|-id=519 bgcolor=#d6d6d6
| 600519 ||  || — || February 7, 2002 || Palomar || NEAT || EOS || align=right | 2.2 km || 
|-id=520 bgcolor=#d6d6d6
| 600520 ||  || — || May 28, 2014 || Haleakala || Pan-STARRS ||  || align=right | 2.6 km || 
|-id=521 bgcolor=#fefefe
| 600521 ||  || — || January 7, 2016 || Haleakala || Pan-STARRS ||  || align=right data-sort-value="0.86" | 860 m || 
|-id=522 bgcolor=#d6d6d6
| 600522 ||  || — || November 4, 2016 || Haleakala || Pan-STARRS ||  || align=right | 2.4 km || 
|-id=523 bgcolor=#d6d6d6
| 600523 ||  || — || October 12, 2016 || Haleakala || Pan-STARRS ||  || align=right | 2.2 km || 
|-id=524 bgcolor=#d6d6d6
| 600524 ||  || — || January 14, 2018 || Mount Lemmon || Mount Lemmon Survey ||  || align=right | 2.1 km || 
|-id=525 bgcolor=#fefefe
| 600525 ||  || — || January 2, 2012 || Kitt Peak || Spacewatch ||  || align=right data-sort-value="0.72" | 720 m || 
|-id=526 bgcolor=#C2FFFF
| 600526 ||  || — || January 1, 2012 || Mount Lemmon || Mount Lemmon Survey || L4 || align=right | 6.0 km || 
|-id=527 bgcolor=#C2FFFF
| 600527 ||  || — || January 2, 2012 || Mount Lemmon || Mount Lemmon Survey || L4 || align=right | 7.3 km || 
|-id=528 bgcolor=#E9E9E9
| 600528 ||  || — || January 1, 2012 || Mount Lemmon || Mount Lemmon Survey ||  || align=right data-sort-value="0.76" | 760 m || 
|-id=529 bgcolor=#fefefe
| 600529 ||  || — || January 2, 2012 || Kitt Peak || Spacewatch ||  || align=right data-sort-value="0.50" | 500 m || 
|-id=530 bgcolor=#d6d6d6
| 600530 ||  || — || January 1, 2012 || Mount Lemmon || Mount Lemmon Survey ||  || align=right | 2.3 km || 
|-id=531 bgcolor=#d6d6d6
| 600531 ||  || — || December 27, 2011 || Mount Lemmon || Mount Lemmon Survey ||  || align=right | 3.0 km || 
|-id=532 bgcolor=#fefefe
| 600532 ||  || — || January 18, 2012 || Kitt Peak || Spacewatch || H || align=right data-sort-value="0.47" | 470 m || 
|-id=533 bgcolor=#FA8072
| 600533 ||  || — || July 13, 2001 || Palomar || NEAT ||  || align=right data-sort-value="0.86" | 860 m || 
|-id=534 bgcolor=#fefefe
| 600534 ||  || — || January 17, 2012 || Les Engarouines || L. Bernasconi ||  || align=right data-sort-value="0.79" | 790 m || 
|-id=535 bgcolor=#fefefe
| 600535 ||  || — || September 10, 2007 || Catalina || CSS ||  || align=right data-sort-value="0.83" | 830 m || 
|-id=536 bgcolor=#fefefe
| 600536 ||  || — || March 19, 2009 || Calar Alto || F. Hormuth ||  || align=right | 1.0 km || 
|-id=537 bgcolor=#fefefe
| 600537 ||  || — || January 20, 2012 || Mount Lemmon || Mount Lemmon Survey ||  || align=right data-sort-value="0.58" | 580 m || 
|-id=538 bgcolor=#fefefe
| 600538 ||  || — || July 10, 2005 || Catalina || CSS || H || align=right | 1.1 km || 
|-id=539 bgcolor=#fefefe
| 600539 ||  || — || January 20, 2012 || Mayhill || N. Falla ||  || align=right data-sort-value="0.73" | 730 m || 
|-id=540 bgcolor=#d6d6d6
| 600540 ||  || — || November 15, 2010 || Mount Lemmon || Mount Lemmon Survey ||  || align=right | 3.9 km || 
|-id=541 bgcolor=#d6d6d6
| 600541 ||  || — || January 10, 2007 || Kitt Peak || Spacewatch ||  || align=right | 2.1 km || 
|-id=542 bgcolor=#d6d6d6
| 600542 ||  || — || January 4, 2012 || Mount Lemmon || Mount Lemmon Survey ||  || align=right | 2.4 km || 
|-id=543 bgcolor=#d6d6d6
| 600543 ||  || — || January 19, 2012 || Mount Lemmon || Mount Lemmon Survey ||  || align=right | 2.7 km || 
|-id=544 bgcolor=#d6d6d6
| 600544 ||  || — || January 19, 2012 || Mount Lemmon || Mount Lemmon Survey ||  || align=right | 2.0 km || 
|-id=545 bgcolor=#fefefe
| 600545 ||  || — || January 2, 2012 || Kitt Peak || Spacewatch ||  || align=right data-sort-value="0.63" | 630 m || 
|-id=546 bgcolor=#d6d6d6
| 600546 ||  || — || January 20, 2012 || Haleakala || Pan-STARRS ||  || align=right | 2.7 km || 
|-id=547 bgcolor=#d6d6d6
| 600547 ||  || — || January 3, 2012 || Kitt Peak || Spacewatch ||  || align=right | 3.2 km || 
|-id=548 bgcolor=#C2FFFF
| 600548 ||  || — || October 26, 2009 || Mount Lemmon || Mount Lemmon Survey || L4 || align=right | 9.5 km || 
|-id=549 bgcolor=#C2FFFF
| 600549 ||  || — || January 24, 2012 || Haleakala || Pan-STARRS || L4 || align=right | 6.8 km || 
|-id=550 bgcolor=#E9E9E9
| 600550 ||  || — || January 4, 2012 || Mount Lemmon || Mount Lemmon Survey ||  || align=right | 2.8 km || 
|-id=551 bgcolor=#C2FFFF
| 600551 ||  || — || January 20, 2012 || Mount Lemmon || Mount Lemmon Survey || L4 || align=right | 7.1 km || 
|-id=552 bgcolor=#d6d6d6
| 600552 ||  || — || January 2, 2012 || Mount Lemmon || Mount Lemmon Survey ||  || align=right | 2.1 km || 
|-id=553 bgcolor=#d6d6d6
| 600553 ||  || — || January 21, 2012 || Kitt Peak || Spacewatch ||  || align=right | 2.6 km || 
|-id=554 bgcolor=#fefefe
| 600554 ||  || — || January 21, 2012 || Kitt Peak || Spacewatch || PHO || align=right data-sort-value="0.66" | 660 m || 
|-id=555 bgcolor=#d6d6d6
| 600555 ||  || — || January 2, 2012 || Kitt Peak || Spacewatch ||  || align=right | 2.8 km || 
|-id=556 bgcolor=#C2FFFF
| 600556 ||  || — || December 18, 2011 || ESA OGS || ESA OGS || L4 || align=right | 8.4 km || 
|-id=557 bgcolor=#d6d6d6
| 600557 ||  || — || February 25, 2007 || Kitt Peak || Spacewatch ||  || align=right | 2.6 km || 
|-id=558 bgcolor=#C2FFFF
| 600558 ||  || — || December 29, 2011 || Mount Lemmon || Mount Lemmon Survey || L4 || align=right | 7.4 km || 
|-id=559 bgcolor=#d6d6d6
| 600559 ||  || — || January 18, 2012 || Kitt Peak || Spacewatch ||  || align=right | 3.0 km || 
|-id=560 bgcolor=#d6d6d6
| 600560 ||  || — || January 26, 2012 || Haleakala || Pan-STARRS ||  || align=right | 2.3 km || 
|-id=561 bgcolor=#d6d6d6
| 600561 ||  || — || September 3, 2010 || Mount Lemmon || Mount Lemmon Survey ||  || align=right | 3.1 km || 
|-id=562 bgcolor=#d6d6d6
| 600562 ||  || — || January 23, 2006 || Mount Lemmon || Mount Lemmon Survey ||  || align=right | 2.5 km || 
|-id=563 bgcolor=#d6d6d6
| 600563 ||  || — || January 30, 2012 || Kitt Peak || Spacewatch ||  || align=right | 2.5 km || 
|-id=564 bgcolor=#C2FFFF
| 600564 ||  || — || January 21, 2012 || Kitt Peak || Spacewatch || L4 || align=right | 7.6 km || 
|-id=565 bgcolor=#fefefe
| 600565 ||  || — || November 1, 2007 || Mount Lemmon || Mount Lemmon Survey ||  || align=right data-sort-value="0.51" | 510 m || 
|-id=566 bgcolor=#d6d6d6
| 600566 ||  || — || January 1, 2012 || Mount Lemmon || Mount Lemmon Survey ||  || align=right | 2.9 km || 
|-id=567 bgcolor=#fefefe
| 600567 ||  || — || August 5, 2005 || Palomar || NEAT || H || align=right data-sort-value="0.70" | 700 m || 
|-id=568 bgcolor=#fefefe
| 600568 ||  || — || May 3, 2005 || Kitt Peak || Kitt Peak Obs. || PHO || align=right | 1.0 km || 
|-id=569 bgcolor=#fefefe
| 600569 ||  || — || December 25, 2011 || Mount Lemmon || Mount Lemmon Survey ||  || align=right data-sort-value="0.79" | 790 m || 
|-id=570 bgcolor=#fefefe
| 600570 ||  || — || December 28, 2011 || Les Engarouines || L. Bernasconi ||  || align=right data-sort-value="0.94" | 940 m || 
|-id=571 bgcolor=#d6d6d6
| 600571 ||  || — || April 28, 2008 || Mount Lemmon || Mount Lemmon Survey ||  || align=right | 2.8 km || 
|-id=572 bgcolor=#d6d6d6
| 600572 ||  || — || May 1, 2003 || Kitt Peak || Spacewatch ||  || align=right | 2.2 km || 
|-id=573 bgcolor=#fefefe
| 600573 ||  || — || January 26, 2012 || Mount Lemmon || Mount Lemmon Survey ||  || align=right data-sort-value="0.49" | 490 m || 
|-id=574 bgcolor=#d6d6d6
| 600574 ||  || — || December 31, 2011 || Kitt Peak || Spacewatch ||  || align=right | 2.5 km || 
|-id=575 bgcolor=#d6d6d6
| 600575 ||  || — || December 1, 2005 || Kitt Peak || Spacewatch ||  || align=right | 2.2 km || 
|-id=576 bgcolor=#fefefe
| 600576 ||  || — || May 17, 2009 || Kitt Peak || Spacewatch ||  || align=right data-sort-value="0.71" | 710 m || 
|-id=577 bgcolor=#fefefe
| 600577 ||  || — || May 12, 2005 || Mount Lemmon || Mount Lemmon Survey || NYS || align=right data-sort-value="0.64" | 640 m || 
|-id=578 bgcolor=#d6d6d6
| 600578 ||  || — || January 29, 2012 || Catalina || CSS || URS || align=right | 4.0 km || 
|-id=579 bgcolor=#C2FFFF
| 600579 ||  || — || November 3, 2010 || Kitt Peak || Spacewatch || L4 || align=right | 7.3 km || 
|-id=580 bgcolor=#fefefe
| 600580 ||  || — || January 19, 2012 || Haleakala || Pan-STARRS || H || align=right data-sort-value="0.46" | 460 m || 
|-id=581 bgcolor=#d6d6d6
| 600581 ||  || — || January 19, 2012 || Haleakala || Pan-STARRS ||  || align=right | 2.0 km || 
|-id=582 bgcolor=#fefefe
| 600582 ||  || — || January 29, 2012 || Kitt Peak || Spacewatch ||  || align=right data-sort-value="0.57" | 570 m || 
|-id=583 bgcolor=#d6d6d6
| 600583 ||  || — || November 24, 2016 || Kitt Peak || Spacewatch ||  || align=right | 3.7 km || 
|-id=584 bgcolor=#E9E9E9
| 600584 ||  || — || August 3, 2014 || Haleakala || Pan-STARRS ||  || align=right | 1.9 km || 
|-id=585 bgcolor=#d6d6d6
| 600585 ||  || — || January 26, 2012 || Haleakala || Pan-STARRS ||  || align=right | 3.1 km || 
|-id=586 bgcolor=#d6d6d6
| 600586 ||  || — || April 10, 2013 || Haleakala || Pan-STARRS ||  || align=right | 2.1 km || 
|-id=587 bgcolor=#d6d6d6
| 600587 ||  || — || January 19, 2012 || Kitt Peak || Spacewatch ||  || align=right | 2.7 km || 
|-id=588 bgcolor=#d6d6d6
| 600588 ||  || — || January 26, 2012 || Haleakala || Pan-STARRS ||  || align=right | 2.7 km || 
|-id=589 bgcolor=#d6d6d6
| 600589 ||  || — || June 29, 2014 || Haleakala || Pan-STARRS ||  || align=right | 2.7 km || 
|-id=590 bgcolor=#d6d6d6
| 600590 ||  || — || April 13, 2013 || Haleakala || Pan-STARRS ||  || align=right | 2.3 km || 
|-id=591 bgcolor=#d6d6d6
| 600591 ||  || — || September 23, 2015 || Haleakala || Pan-STARRS ||  || align=right | 2.5 km || 
|-id=592 bgcolor=#d6d6d6
| 600592 ||  || — || July 26, 2015 || Haleakala || Pan-STARRS ||  || align=right | 2.5 km || 
|-id=593 bgcolor=#d6d6d6
| 600593 ||  || — || January 15, 2018 || Haleakala || Pan-STARRS ||  || align=right | 2.4 km || 
|-id=594 bgcolor=#d6d6d6
| 600594 ||  || — || January 19, 2012 || Mount Lemmon || Mount Lemmon Survey ||  || align=right | 2.5 km || 
|-id=595 bgcolor=#d6d6d6
| 600595 ||  || — || January 14, 2018 || Mount Lemmon || Mount Lemmon Survey ||  || align=right | 2.3 km || 
|-id=596 bgcolor=#d6d6d6
| 600596 ||  || — || January 16, 2018 || Haleakala || Pan-STARRS ||  || align=right | 2.1 km || 
|-id=597 bgcolor=#fefefe
| 600597 ||  || — || January 18, 2012 || Mount Lemmon || Mount Lemmon Survey ||  || align=right data-sort-value="0.66" | 660 m || 
|-id=598 bgcolor=#C2FFFF
| 600598 ||  || — || October 6, 2008 || Mount Lemmon || Mount Lemmon Survey || L4 || align=right | 6.4 km || 
|-id=599 bgcolor=#fefefe
| 600599 ||  || — || January 26, 2012 || Kitt Peak || Spacewatch ||  || align=right data-sort-value="0.50" | 500 m || 
|-id=600 bgcolor=#d6d6d6
| 600600 ||  || — || January 19, 2012 || Kitt Peak || Spacewatch ||  || align=right | 2.2 km || 
|}

600601–600700 

|-bgcolor=#fefefe
| 600601 ||  || — || January 26, 2012 || Mount Lemmon || Mount Lemmon Survey ||  || align=right data-sort-value="0.57" | 570 m || 
|-id=602 bgcolor=#d6d6d6
| 600602 ||  || — || January 19, 2012 || Haleakala || Pan-STARRS ||  || align=right | 2.5 km || 
|-id=603 bgcolor=#d6d6d6
| 600603 ||  || — || January 27, 2012 || Mount Lemmon || Mount Lemmon Survey ||  || align=right | 2.5 km || 
|-id=604 bgcolor=#d6d6d6
| 600604 ||  || — || January 27, 2012 || Mount Lemmon || Mount Lemmon Survey ||  || align=right | 2.1 km || 
|-id=605 bgcolor=#C2FFFF
| 600605 ||  || — || January 18, 2012 || Mount Lemmon || Mount Lemmon Survey || L4 || align=right | 6.8 km || 
|-id=606 bgcolor=#d6d6d6
| 600606 ||  || — || January 20, 2012 || Kitt Peak || Spacewatch ||  || align=right | 2.1 km || 
|-id=607 bgcolor=#d6d6d6
| 600607 ||  || — || January 29, 2012 || Kitt Peak || Spacewatch ||  || align=right | 2.2 km || 
|-id=608 bgcolor=#d6d6d6
| 600608 ||  || — || September 19, 2003 || Palomar || NEAT ||  || align=right | 4.2 km || 
|-id=609 bgcolor=#fefefe
| 600609 ||  || — || February 3, 2012 || Haleakala || Pan-STARRS ||  || align=right data-sort-value="0.60" | 600 m || 
|-id=610 bgcolor=#C2FFFF
| 600610 ||  || — || September 24, 2008 || Kitt Peak || Spacewatch || L4 || align=right | 5.8 km || 
|-id=611 bgcolor=#fefefe
| 600611 ||  || — || October 9, 2007 || Kitt Peak || Spacewatch ||  || align=right data-sort-value="0.55" | 550 m || 
|-id=612 bgcolor=#fefefe
| 600612 ||  || — || October 15, 2004 || Mount Lemmon || Mount Lemmon Survey ||  || align=right data-sort-value="0.59" | 590 m || 
|-id=613 bgcolor=#fefefe
| 600613 ||  || — || October 24, 2005 || Palomar || NEAT || H || align=right data-sort-value="0.87" | 870 m || 
|-id=614 bgcolor=#d6d6d6
| 600614 ||  || — || January 25, 2012 || Haleakala || Pan-STARRS ||  || align=right | 2.5 km || 
|-id=615 bgcolor=#fefefe
| 600615 ||  || — || December 18, 2004 || Mount Lemmon || Mount Lemmon Survey ||  || align=right data-sort-value="0.93" | 930 m || 
|-id=616 bgcolor=#fefefe
| 600616 ||  || — || October 1, 2010 || Mount Lemmon || Mount Lemmon Survey ||  || align=right data-sort-value="0.52" | 520 m || 
|-id=617 bgcolor=#fefefe
| 600617 ||  || — || April 14, 2005 || Kitt Peak || Spacewatch ||  || align=right data-sort-value="0.72" | 720 m || 
|-id=618 bgcolor=#d6d6d6
| 600618 ||  || — || November 12, 2010 || Mount Lemmon || Mount Lemmon Survey ||  || align=right | 2.4 km || 
|-id=619 bgcolor=#d6d6d6
| 600619 ||  || — || February 3, 2012 || Haleakala || Pan-STARRS ||  || align=right | 2.6 km || 
|-id=620 bgcolor=#d6d6d6
| 600620 ||  || — || January 21, 2012 || Kitt Peak || Spacewatch ||  || align=right | 2.3 km || 
|-id=621 bgcolor=#d6d6d6
| 600621 ||  || — || December 30, 2005 || Kitt Peak || Spacewatch ||  || align=right | 2.9 km || 
|-id=622 bgcolor=#d6d6d6
| 600622 ||  || — || February 3, 2012 || Haleakala || Pan-STARRS ||  || align=right | 2.5 km || 
|-id=623 bgcolor=#d6d6d6
| 600623 ||  || — || September 30, 2003 || Kitt Peak || Spacewatch ||  || align=right | 3.1 km || 
|-id=624 bgcolor=#d6d6d6
| 600624 ||  || — || February 13, 2012 || Haleakala || Pan-STARRS ||  || align=right | 2.4 km || 
|-id=625 bgcolor=#d6d6d6
| 600625 ||  || — || March 25, 2007 || Mount Lemmon || Mount Lemmon Survey ||  || align=right | 2.3 km || 
|-id=626 bgcolor=#fefefe
| 600626 ||  || — || September 5, 2000 || Apache Point || SDSS Collaboration ||  || align=right | 1.00 km || 
|-id=627 bgcolor=#fefefe
| 600627 ||  || — || February 3, 2012 || Mount Lemmon || Mount Lemmon Survey ||  || align=right data-sort-value="0.55" | 550 m || 
|-id=628 bgcolor=#d6d6d6
| 600628 ||  || — || February 3, 2012 || Haleakala || Pan-STARRS ||  || align=right | 2.5 km || 
|-id=629 bgcolor=#fefefe
| 600629 ||  || — || February 15, 2012 || Haleakala || Pan-STARRS ||  || align=right data-sort-value="0.52" | 520 m || 
|-id=630 bgcolor=#d6d6d6
| 600630 ||  || — || February 1, 2012 || Mount Lemmon || Mount Lemmon Survey ||  || align=right | 2.3 km || 
|-id=631 bgcolor=#d6d6d6
| 600631 ||  || — || February 3, 2012 || Haleakala || Pan-STARRS ||  || align=right | 2.4 km || 
|-id=632 bgcolor=#d6d6d6
| 600632 ||  || — || February 3, 2012 || Mount Lemmon || Mount Lemmon Survey ||  || align=right | 2.9 km || 
|-id=633 bgcolor=#d6d6d6
| 600633 ||  || — || February 14, 2012 || Haleakala || Pan-STARRS || 7:4 || align=right | 2.5 km || 
|-id=634 bgcolor=#fefefe
| 600634 ||  || — || January 21, 2012 || Haleakala || Pan-STARRS || H || align=right data-sort-value="0.50" | 500 m || 
|-id=635 bgcolor=#d6d6d6
| 600635 ||  || — || March 13, 2007 || Kitt Peak || Spacewatch ||  || align=right | 2.7 km || 
|-id=636 bgcolor=#fefefe
| 600636 ||  || — || March 4, 2005 || Mount Lemmon || Mount Lemmon Survey ||  || align=right data-sort-value="0.56" | 560 m || 
|-id=637 bgcolor=#fefefe
| 600637 ||  || — || January 19, 2012 || Haleakala || Pan-STARRS ||  || align=right data-sort-value="0.58" | 580 m || 
|-id=638 bgcolor=#fefefe
| 600638 ||  || — || September 14, 2010 || Kitt Peak || Spacewatch ||  || align=right data-sort-value="0.98" | 980 m || 
|-id=639 bgcolor=#d6d6d6
| 600639 ||  || — || February 21, 2012 || Oukaimeden || M. Ory ||  || align=right | 2.7 km || 
|-id=640 bgcolor=#fefefe
| 600640 ||  || — || February 22, 2012 || Kitt Peak || Spacewatch ||  || align=right data-sort-value="0.82" | 820 m || 
|-id=641 bgcolor=#d6d6d6
| 600641 ||  || — || January 20, 2012 || Kitt Peak || Spacewatch ||  || align=right | 2.7 km || 
|-id=642 bgcolor=#d6d6d6
| 600642 ||  || — || August 1, 2009 || Kitt Peak || Spacewatch ||  || align=right | 2.8 km || 
|-id=643 bgcolor=#fefefe
| 600643 ||  || — || December 25, 2011 || Mount Lemmon || Mount Lemmon Survey ||  || align=right data-sort-value="0.73" | 730 m || 
|-id=644 bgcolor=#d6d6d6
| 600644 ||  || — || February 21, 2012 || Kitt Peak || Spacewatch ||  || align=right | 2.3 km || 
|-id=645 bgcolor=#fefefe
| 600645 ||  || — || March 10, 2005 || Mount Lemmon || Mount Lemmon Survey ||  || align=right data-sort-value="0.67" | 670 m || 
|-id=646 bgcolor=#fefefe
| 600646 ||  || — || February 21, 2012 || Kitt Peak || Spacewatch ||  || align=right data-sort-value="0.73" | 730 m || 
|-id=647 bgcolor=#d6d6d6
| 600647 ||  || — || December 31, 2000 || Haleakala || AMOS ||  || align=right | 2.7 km || 
|-id=648 bgcolor=#fefefe
| 600648 ||  || — || September 30, 2010 || Mount Lemmon || Mount Lemmon Survey ||  || align=right data-sort-value="0.53" | 530 m || 
|-id=649 bgcolor=#d6d6d6
| 600649 ||  || — || October 7, 2005 || Mauna Kea || Mauna Kea Obs. || Tj (2.97) || align=right | 3.8 km || 
|-id=650 bgcolor=#fefefe
| 600650 ||  || — || March 22, 2001 || Kitt Peak || Spacewatch ||  || align=right data-sort-value="0.98" | 980 m || 
|-id=651 bgcolor=#d6d6d6
| 600651 ||  || — || December 13, 1999 || Kitt Peak || Spacewatch ||  || align=right | 2.6 km || 
|-id=652 bgcolor=#fefefe
| 600652 ||  || — || April 4, 2005 || Mount Lemmon || Mount Lemmon Survey ||  || align=right data-sort-value="0.54" | 540 m || 
|-id=653 bgcolor=#fefefe
| 600653 ||  || — || August 13, 2010 || Kitt Peak || Spacewatch ||  || align=right data-sort-value="0.70" | 700 m || 
|-id=654 bgcolor=#fefefe
| 600654 ||  || — || February 26, 2012 || Haleakala || Pan-STARRS ||  || align=right data-sort-value="0.67" | 670 m || 
|-id=655 bgcolor=#d6d6d6
| 600655 ||  || — || January 8, 2006 || Catalina || CSS ||  || align=right | 3.7 km || 
|-id=656 bgcolor=#d6d6d6
| 600656 ||  || — || January 30, 2012 || Kitt Peak || Spacewatch ||  || align=right | 2.4 km || 
|-id=657 bgcolor=#d6d6d6
| 600657 ||  || — || January 27, 2012 || Mount Lemmon || Mount Lemmon Survey ||  || align=right | 2.1 km || 
|-id=658 bgcolor=#fefefe
| 600658 ||  || — || February 11, 2004 || Kitt Peak || Spacewatch ||  || align=right data-sort-value="0.87" | 870 m || 
|-id=659 bgcolor=#fefefe
| 600659 ||  || — || January 15, 2004 || Kitt Peak || Spacewatch ||  || align=right data-sort-value="0.77" | 770 m || 
|-id=660 bgcolor=#fefefe
| 600660 ||  || — || May 15, 2005 || Mount Lemmon || Mount Lemmon Survey ||  || align=right data-sort-value="0.69" | 690 m || 
|-id=661 bgcolor=#d6d6d6
| 600661 ||  || — || February 26, 2012 || Haleakala || Pan-STARRS ||  || align=right | 2.6 km || 
|-id=662 bgcolor=#d6d6d6
| 600662 ||  || — || February 27, 2012 || Haleakala || Pan-STARRS ||  || align=right | 2.1 km || 
|-id=663 bgcolor=#fefefe
| 600663 ||  || — || February 21, 2012 || Kitt Peak || Spacewatch ||  || align=right data-sort-value="0.58" | 580 m || 
|-id=664 bgcolor=#d6d6d6
| 600664 ||  || — || January 10, 2006 || Kitt Peak || Spacewatch ||  || align=right | 2.4 km || 
|-id=665 bgcolor=#d6d6d6
| 600665 ||  || — || February 21, 2012 || Oukaimeden || M. Ory ||  || align=right | 2.9 km || 
|-id=666 bgcolor=#fefefe
| 600666 ||  || — || February 28, 2012 || Haleakala || Pan-STARRS ||  || align=right data-sort-value="0.74" | 740 m || 
|-id=667 bgcolor=#fefefe
| 600667 ||  || — || February 23, 2012 || Mount Lemmon || Mount Lemmon Survey ||  || align=right data-sort-value="0.55" | 550 m || 
|-id=668 bgcolor=#fefefe
| 600668 ||  || — || February 27, 2012 || Haleakala || Pan-STARRS ||  || align=right data-sort-value="0.76" | 760 m || 
|-id=669 bgcolor=#d6d6d6
| 600669 ||  || — || February 27, 2012 || Haleakala || Pan-STARRS ||  || align=right | 2.7 km || 
|-id=670 bgcolor=#fefefe
| 600670 ||  || — || February 28, 2012 || Haleakala || Pan-STARRS ||  || align=right data-sort-value="0.61" | 610 m || 
|-id=671 bgcolor=#d6d6d6
| 600671 ||  || — || February 26, 2012 || Kitt Peak || Spacewatch ||  || align=right | 2.2 km || 
|-id=672 bgcolor=#d6d6d6
| 600672 ||  || — || February 28, 2012 || Haleakala || Pan-STARRS ||  || align=right | 2.4 km || 
|-id=673 bgcolor=#fefefe
| 600673 ||  || — || April 9, 2005 || Mount Lemmon || Mount Lemmon Survey || V || align=right data-sort-value="0.54" | 540 m || 
|-id=674 bgcolor=#fefefe
| 600674 ||  || — || March 14, 2012 || Haleakala || Pan-STARRS || H || align=right data-sort-value="0.49" | 490 m || 
|-id=675 bgcolor=#E9E9E9
| 600675 ||  || — || November 10, 2010 || Mount Lemmon || Mount Lemmon Survey ||  || align=right data-sort-value="0.69" | 690 m || 
|-id=676 bgcolor=#d6d6d6
| 600676 ||  || — || March 15, 2012 || Mount Lemmon || Mount Lemmon Survey || 3:2 || align=right | 3.7 km || 
|-id=677 bgcolor=#d6d6d6
| 600677 ||  || — || February 25, 2012 || Mount Graham || R. P. Boyle, V. Laugalys ||  || align=right | 2.7 km || 
|-id=678 bgcolor=#fefefe
| 600678 ||  || — || November 8, 2007 || Mount Lemmon || Mount Lemmon Survey ||  || align=right data-sort-value="0.88" | 880 m || 
|-id=679 bgcolor=#fefefe
| 600679 ||  || — || October 9, 2010 || Mount Lemmon || Mount Lemmon Survey || H || align=right data-sort-value="0.70" | 700 m || 
|-id=680 bgcolor=#fefefe
| 600680 ||  || — || September 12, 2005 || Kitt Peak || Spacewatch || H || align=right data-sort-value="0.61" | 610 m || 
|-id=681 bgcolor=#fefefe
| 600681 ||  || — || March 14, 2012 || Catalina || CSS || H || align=right data-sort-value="0.52" | 520 m || 
|-id=682 bgcolor=#d6d6d6
| 600682 ||  || — || September 16, 2009 || Mount Lemmon || Mount Lemmon Survey ||  || align=right | 2.5 km || 
|-id=683 bgcolor=#fefefe
| 600683 ||  || — || March 14, 2012 || Mount Lemmon || Mount Lemmon Survey ||  || align=right data-sort-value="0.72" | 720 m || 
|-id=684 bgcolor=#d6d6d6
| 600684 ||  || — || August 27, 2014 || Haleakala || Pan-STARRS ||  || align=right | 2.5 km || 
|-id=685 bgcolor=#d6d6d6
| 600685 ||  || — || March 13, 2012 || Haleakala || Pan-STARRS ||  || align=right | 3.0 km || 
|-id=686 bgcolor=#fefefe
| 600686 ||  || — || September 10, 2007 || Mount Lemmon || Mount Lemmon Survey ||  || align=right data-sort-value="0.65" | 650 m || 
|-id=687 bgcolor=#fefefe
| 600687 ||  || — || September 5, 2010 || Mount Lemmon || Mount Lemmon Survey ||  || align=right data-sort-value="0.54" | 540 m || 
|-id=688 bgcolor=#d6d6d6
| 600688 ||  || — || February 16, 2012 || Haleakala || Pan-STARRS ||  || align=right | 2.2 km || 
|-id=689 bgcolor=#d6d6d6
| 600689 ||  || — || January 7, 2006 || Kitt Peak || Spacewatch ||  || align=right | 2.9 km || 
|-id=690 bgcolor=#E9E9E9
| 600690 ||  || — || March 1, 2008 || Kitt Peak || Spacewatch ||  || align=right | 1.1 km || 
|-id=691 bgcolor=#fefefe
| 600691 ||  || — || April 12, 2004 || Kitt Peak || Spacewatch || H || align=right data-sort-value="0.75" | 750 m || 
|-id=692 bgcolor=#d6d6d6
| 600692 ||  || — || December 4, 2011 || Haleakala || Pan-STARRS ||  || align=right | 3.0 km || 
|-id=693 bgcolor=#fefefe
| 600693 ||  || — || March 22, 2012 || Mount Lemmon || Mount Lemmon Survey ||  || align=right data-sort-value="0.66" | 660 m || 
|-id=694 bgcolor=#d6d6d6
| 600694 ||  || — || February 20, 2006 || Mount Lemmon || Mount Lemmon Survey ||  || align=right | 3.0 km || 
|-id=695 bgcolor=#fefefe
| 600695 ||  || — || February 27, 2012 || Haleakala || Pan-STARRS ||  || align=right data-sort-value="0.68" | 680 m || 
|-id=696 bgcolor=#d6d6d6
| 600696 ||  || — || March 17, 2012 || Mount Lemmon || Mount Lemmon Survey ||  || align=right | 1.9 km || 
|-id=697 bgcolor=#fefefe
| 600697 ||  || — || March 15, 2012 || Mount Lemmon || Mount Lemmon Survey ||  || align=right data-sort-value="0.69" | 690 m || 
|-id=698 bgcolor=#fefefe
| 600698 ||  || — || December 4, 2007 || Kitt Peak || Spacewatch ||  || align=right data-sort-value="0.67" | 670 m || 
|-id=699 bgcolor=#fefefe
| 600699 ||  || — || September 30, 2005 || Catalina || CSS || H || align=right data-sort-value="0.75" | 750 m || 
|-id=700 bgcolor=#d6d6d6
| 600700 ||  || — || March 22, 2012 || Mount Lemmon || Mount Lemmon Survey ||  || align=right | 2.6 km || 
|}

600701–600800 

|-bgcolor=#E9E9E9
| 600701 ||  || — || April 1, 2008 || Kitt Peak || Spacewatch ||  || align=right data-sort-value="0.66" | 660 m || 
|-id=702 bgcolor=#fefefe
| 600702 ||  || — || February 28, 2012 || Haleakala || Pan-STARRS ||  || align=right data-sort-value="0.53" | 530 m || 
|-id=703 bgcolor=#d6d6d6
| 600703 ||  || — || July 23, 2003 || Palomar || NEAT ||  || align=right | 3.6 km || 
|-id=704 bgcolor=#d6d6d6
| 600704 ||  || — || August 27, 2009 || Kitt Peak || Spacewatch ||  || align=right | 2.4 km || 
|-id=705 bgcolor=#fefefe
| 600705 ||  || — || February 1, 2012 || Mount Lemmon || Mount Lemmon Survey ||  || align=right data-sort-value="0.78" | 780 m || 
|-id=706 bgcolor=#fefefe
| 600706 ||  || — || March 26, 2012 || Mount Lemmon || Mount Lemmon Survey || H || align=right data-sort-value="0.67" | 670 m || 
|-id=707 bgcolor=#d6d6d6
| 600707 ||  || — || March 26, 2012 || Mount Lemmon || Mount Lemmon Survey ||  || align=right | 2.5 km || 
|-id=708 bgcolor=#d6d6d6
| 600708 ||  || — || March 30, 2012 || Mount Lemmon || Mount Lemmon Survey ||  || align=right | 2.3 km || 
|-id=709 bgcolor=#d6d6d6
| 600709 ||  || — || March 25, 2012 || Catalina || CSS ||  || align=right | 3.0 km || 
|-id=710 bgcolor=#fefefe
| 600710 ||  || — || March 28, 2012 || Mount Lemmon || Mount Lemmon Survey ||  || align=right data-sort-value="0.63" | 630 m || 
|-id=711 bgcolor=#fefefe
| 600711 ||  || — || September 20, 2006 || Catalina || CSS ||  || align=right data-sort-value="0.98" | 980 m || 
|-id=712 bgcolor=#fefefe
| 600712 ||  || — || February 24, 2012 || Mayhill-ISON || L. Elenin ||  || align=right data-sort-value="0.81" | 810 m || 
|-id=713 bgcolor=#FA8072
| 600713 ||  || — || March 27, 2012 || Mount Lemmon || Mount Lemmon Survey || H || align=right data-sort-value="0.50" | 500 m || 
|-id=714 bgcolor=#fefefe
| 600714 ||  || — || April 12, 2012 || Catalina || CSS || H || align=right data-sort-value="0.73" | 730 m || 
|-id=715 bgcolor=#fefefe
| 600715 ||  || — || April 2, 2005 || Kitt Peak || Spacewatch ||  || align=right data-sort-value="0.66" | 660 m || 
|-id=716 bgcolor=#fefefe
| 600716 ||  || — || March 27, 2012 || Haleakala || Pan-STARRS ||  || align=right data-sort-value="0.67" | 670 m || 
|-id=717 bgcolor=#fefefe
| 600717 ||  || — || October 16, 2006 || Catalina || CSS ||  || align=right | 1.1 km || 
|-id=718 bgcolor=#d6d6d6
| 600718 ||  || — || April 15, 2012 || Haleakala || Pan-STARRS ||  || align=right | 2.8 km || 
|-id=719 bgcolor=#fefefe
| 600719 ||  || — || September 30, 2002 || Haleakala || AMOS || H || align=right data-sort-value="0.81" | 810 m || 
|-id=720 bgcolor=#d6d6d6
| 600720 ||  || — || April 22, 2007 || Mount Lemmon || Mount Lemmon Survey ||  || align=right | 4.3 km || 
|-id=721 bgcolor=#fefefe
| 600721 ||  || — || March 28, 2012 || Kitt Peak || Spacewatch ||  || align=right data-sort-value="0.56" | 560 m || 
|-id=722 bgcolor=#fefefe
| 600722 ||  || — || May 4, 2005 || Palomar || NEAT ||  || align=right data-sort-value="0.86" | 860 m || 
|-id=723 bgcolor=#fefefe
| 600723 ||  || — || January 20, 2009 || Catalina || CSS || H || align=right data-sort-value="0.70" | 700 m || 
|-id=724 bgcolor=#fefefe
| 600724 ||  || — || April 13, 2012 || Kitt Peak || Spacewatch ||  || align=right data-sort-value="0.55" | 550 m || 
|-id=725 bgcolor=#FA8072
| 600725 ||  || — || April 16, 2012 || Socorro || LINEAR ||  || align=right | 1.4 km || 
|-id=726 bgcolor=#fefefe
| 600726 ||  || — || October 24, 2005 || Kitt Peak || Spacewatch || H || align=right data-sort-value="0.42" | 420 m || 
|-id=727 bgcolor=#fefefe
| 600727 ||  || — || February 7, 2008 || Mount Lemmon || Mount Lemmon Survey ||  || align=right data-sort-value="0.70" | 700 m || 
|-id=728 bgcolor=#fefefe
| 600728 ||  || — || April 11, 2012 || Mount Lemmon || Mount Lemmon Survey ||  || align=right data-sort-value="0.57" | 570 m || 
|-id=729 bgcolor=#fefefe
| 600729 ||  || — || February 29, 2008 || Kitt Peak || Spacewatch ||  || align=right data-sort-value="0.82" | 820 m || 
|-id=730 bgcolor=#fefefe
| 600730 ||  || — || April 20, 2012 || Mount Lemmon || Mount Lemmon Survey ||  || align=right data-sort-value="0.61" | 610 m || 
|-id=731 bgcolor=#fefefe
| 600731 ||  || — || April 23, 2012 || Mount Lemmon || Mount Lemmon Survey || H || align=right data-sort-value="0.48" | 480 m || 
|-id=732 bgcolor=#fefefe
| 600732 ||  || — || March 31, 2012 || Mount Lemmon || Mount Lemmon Survey ||  || align=right data-sort-value="0.81" | 810 m || 
|-id=733 bgcolor=#E9E9E9
| 600733 ||  || — || September 15, 2009 || Kitt Peak || Spacewatch ||  || align=right | 1.2 km || 
|-id=734 bgcolor=#fefefe
| 600734 ||  || — || September 2, 2010 || Mount Lemmon || Mount Lemmon Survey || H || align=right data-sort-value="0.67" | 670 m || 
|-id=735 bgcolor=#fefefe
| 600735 ||  || — || April 21, 2012 || Catalina || CSS ||  || align=right data-sort-value="0.84" | 840 m || 
|-id=736 bgcolor=#fefefe
| 600736 ||  || — || March 24, 2012 || Mayhill-ISON || L. Elenin || H || align=right data-sort-value="0.71" | 710 m || 
|-id=737 bgcolor=#fefefe
| 600737 ||  || — || August 22, 2003 || Campo Imperatore || A. Boattini, A. Di Paola ||  || align=right data-sort-value="0.60" | 600 m || 
|-id=738 bgcolor=#fefefe
| 600738 ||  || — || March 21, 2001 || Haleakala || AMOS ||  || align=right data-sort-value="0.87" | 870 m || 
|-id=739 bgcolor=#E9E9E9
| 600739 ||  || — || April 27, 2012 || Kitt Peak || Spacewatch ||  || align=right data-sort-value="0.59" | 590 m || 
|-id=740 bgcolor=#FA8072
| 600740 ||  || — || December 19, 2007 || Mount Lemmon || Mount Lemmon Survey ||  || align=right data-sort-value="0.73" | 730 m || 
|-id=741 bgcolor=#fefefe
| 600741 ||  || — || April 16, 2012 || Kitt Peak || Spacewatch ||  || align=right data-sort-value="0.67" | 670 m || 
|-id=742 bgcolor=#fefefe
| 600742 ||  || — || March 8, 2005 || Mount Lemmon || Mount Lemmon Survey ||  || align=right data-sort-value="0.51" | 510 m || 
|-id=743 bgcolor=#fefefe
| 600743 ||  || — || April 18, 2012 || Mount Lemmon || Mount Lemmon Survey ||  || align=right data-sort-value="0.83" | 830 m || 
|-id=744 bgcolor=#fefefe
| 600744 ||  || — || May 11, 2005 || Palomar || NEAT ||  || align=right data-sort-value="0.70" | 700 m || 
|-id=745 bgcolor=#fefefe
| 600745 ||  || — || March 3, 2005 || Catalina || CSS ||  || align=right data-sort-value="0.63" | 630 m || 
|-id=746 bgcolor=#fefefe
| 600746 ||  || — || April 27, 2012 || Haleakala || Pan-STARRS ||  || align=right data-sort-value="0.75" | 750 m || 
|-id=747 bgcolor=#fefefe
| 600747 ||  || — || March 16, 2012 || Kitt Peak || Spacewatch ||  || align=right data-sort-value="0.73" | 730 m || 
|-id=748 bgcolor=#d6d6d6
| 600748 ||  || — || March 24, 2012 || Kitt Peak || Spacewatch ||  || align=right | 2.5 km || 
|-id=749 bgcolor=#fefefe
| 600749 ||  || — || March 4, 2012 || Mount Lemmon || Mount Lemmon Survey ||  || align=right data-sort-value="0.58" | 580 m || 
|-id=750 bgcolor=#fefefe
| 600750 ||  || — || March 11, 2005 || Kitt Peak || Spacewatch ||  || align=right data-sort-value="0.51" | 510 m || 
|-id=751 bgcolor=#FA8072
| 600751 ||  || — || March 27, 2012 || Mount Lemmon || Mount Lemmon Survey ||  || align=right data-sort-value="0.72" | 720 m || 
|-id=752 bgcolor=#E9E9E9
| 600752 ||  || — || November 18, 2006 || Mount Lemmon || Mount Lemmon Survey ||  || align=right | 1.4 km || 
|-id=753 bgcolor=#E9E9E9
| 600753 ||  || — || May 3, 2008 || Mount Lemmon || Mount Lemmon Survey ||  || align=right | 1.2 km || 
|-id=754 bgcolor=#fefefe
| 600754 ||  || — || March 9, 2008 || Mount Lemmon || Mount Lemmon Survey ||  || align=right data-sort-value="0.75" | 750 m || 
|-id=755 bgcolor=#fefefe
| 600755 ||  || — || April 30, 2012 || Mount Lemmon || Mount Lemmon Survey ||  || align=right | 1.0 km || 
|-id=756 bgcolor=#fefefe
| 600756 ||  || — || April 13, 2012 || Kitt Peak || Spacewatch ||  || align=right data-sort-value="0.58" | 580 m || 
|-id=757 bgcolor=#fefefe
| 600757 ||  || — || March 22, 2012 || Catalina || CSS || H || align=right data-sort-value="0.80" | 800 m || 
|-id=758 bgcolor=#E9E9E9
| 600758 ||  || — || April 20, 2012 || Mount Lemmon || Mount Lemmon Survey ||  || align=right data-sort-value="0.62" | 620 m || 
|-id=759 bgcolor=#d6d6d6
| 600759 ||  || — || July 5, 2014 || Haleakala || Pan-STARRS ||  || align=right | 3.7 km || 
|-id=760 bgcolor=#fefefe
| 600760 ||  || — || April 27, 2012 || Haleakala || Pan-STARRS ||  || align=right data-sort-value="0.57" | 570 m || 
|-id=761 bgcolor=#fefefe
| 600761 ||  || — || April 19, 2012 || Mount Lemmon || Mount Lemmon Survey ||  || align=right data-sort-value="0.66" | 660 m || 
|-id=762 bgcolor=#d6d6d6
| 600762 ||  || — || April 16, 2012 || Haleakala || Pan-STARRS ||  || align=right | 2.4 km || 
|-id=763 bgcolor=#d6d6d6
| 600763 ||  || — || April 27, 2012 || Haleakala || Pan-STARRS ||  || align=right | 2.4 km || 
|-id=764 bgcolor=#E9E9E9
| 600764 ||  || — || April 20, 2012 || Kitt Peak || Spacewatch ||  || align=right | 1.5 km || 
|-id=765 bgcolor=#fefefe
| 600765 ||  || — || April 24, 2012 || Kitt Peak || Spacewatch ||  || align=right data-sort-value="0.77" | 770 m || 
|-id=766 bgcolor=#fefefe
| 600766 ||  || — || July 5, 2005 || Mount Lemmon || Mount Lemmon Survey ||  || align=right data-sort-value="0.71" | 710 m || 
|-id=767 bgcolor=#fefefe
| 600767 ||  || — || May 1, 2012 || Mount Lemmon || Mount Lemmon Survey ||  || align=right data-sort-value="0.70" | 700 m || 
|-id=768 bgcolor=#fefefe
| 600768 ||  || — || May 12, 2012 || Haleakala || Pan-STARRS ||  || align=right data-sort-value="0.68" | 680 m || 
|-id=769 bgcolor=#E9E9E9
| 600769 ||  || — || June 11, 2000 || Socorro || LINEAR ||  || align=right | 1.3 km || 
|-id=770 bgcolor=#fefefe
| 600770 ||  || — || August 25, 2005 || Palomar || NEAT ||  || align=right data-sort-value="0.80" | 800 m || 
|-id=771 bgcolor=#fefefe
| 600771 ||  || — || May 15, 2012 || Kitt Peak || Spacewatch || H || align=right data-sort-value="0.62" | 620 m || 
|-id=772 bgcolor=#E9E9E9
| 600772 ||  || — || April 27, 2008 || Kitt Peak || Spacewatch ||  || align=right data-sort-value="0.72" | 720 m || 
|-id=773 bgcolor=#fefefe
| 600773 ||  || — || April 21, 2012 || Mount Lemmon || Mount Lemmon Survey ||  || align=right data-sort-value="0.63" | 630 m || 
|-id=774 bgcolor=#fefefe
| 600774 ||  || — || February 10, 2008 || Kitt Peak || Spacewatch ||  || align=right data-sort-value="0.76" | 760 m || 
|-id=775 bgcolor=#fefefe
| 600775 ||  || — || November 24, 2008 || Mount Lemmon || Mount Lemmon Survey || H || align=right data-sort-value="0.54" | 540 m || 
|-id=776 bgcolor=#d6d6d6
| 600776 ||  || — || January 30, 2011 || Mayhill-ISON || L. Elenin ||  || align=right | 3.0 km || 
|-id=777 bgcolor=#fefefe
| 600777 ||  || — || April 5, 2008 || Mount Lemmon || Mount Lemmon Survey ||  || align=right data-sort-value="0.63" | 630 m || 
|-id=778 bgcolor=#d6d6d6
| 600778 ||  || — || April 16, 2007 || Mount Lemmon || Mount Lemmon Survey ||  || align=right | 1.8 km || 
|-id=779 bgcolor=#E9E9E9
| 600779 ||  || — || April 27, 2008 || Kitt Peak || Spacewatch ||  || align=right data-sort-value="0.63" | 630 m || 
|-id=780 bgcolor=#d6d6d6
| 600780 ||  || — || September 26, 2003 || Apache Point || SDSS Collaboration ||  || align=right | 3.4 km || 
|-id=781 bgcolor=#fefefe
| 600781 ||  || — || August 6, 2005 || Palomar || NEAT ||  || align=right data-sort-value="0.82" | 820 m || 
|-id=782 bgcolor=#fefefe
| 600782 ||  || — || February 18, 2005 || La Silla || A. Boattini ||  || align=right data-sort-value="0.86" | 860 m || 
|-id=783 bgcolor=#fefefe
| 600783 ||  || — || August 27, 2009 || Kitt Peak || Spacewatch ||  || align=right data-sort-value="0.58" | 580 m || 
|-id=784 bgcolor=#fefefe
| 600784 ||  || — || March 15, 2016 || Haleakala || Pan-STARRS ||  || align=right data-sort-value="0.70" | 700 m || 
|-id=785 bgcolor=#fefefe
| 600785 ||  || — || May 1, 2012 || Mount Lemmon || Mount Lemmon Survey ||  || align=right data-sort-value="0.55" | 550 m || 
|-id=786 bgcolor=#fefefe
| 600786 ||  || — || March 28, 2012 || Mount Lemmon || Mount Lemmon Survey ||  || align=right data-sort-value="0.61" | 610 m || 
|-id=787 bgcolor=#FA8072
| 600787 ||  || — || August 20, 2002 || Palomar || NEAT ||  || align=right data-sort-value="0.62" | 620 m || 
|-id=788 bgcolor=#E9E9E9
| 600788 ||  || — || May 8, 2008 || Mount Lemmon || Mount Lemmon Survey ||  || align=right data-sort-value="0.80" | 800 m || 
|-id=789 bgcolor=#fefefe
| 600789 ||  || — || May 20, 2012 || Mount Lemmon || Mount Lemmon Survey ||  || align=right data-sort-value="0.49" | 490 m || 
|-id=790 bgcolor=#fefefe
| 600790 ||  || — || April 25, 2012 || Mount Lemmon || Mount Lemmon Survey || H || align=right data-sort-value="0.72" | 720 m || 
|-id=791 bgcolor=#d6d6d6
| 600791 ||  || — || January 30, 2011 || Mount Lemmon || Mount Lemmon Survey ||  || align=right | 2.5 km || 
|-id=792 bgcolor=#fefefe
| 600792 ||  || — || March 29, 2012 || Kitt Peak || Spacewatch || MAS || align=right data-sort-value="0.61" | 610 m || 
|-id=793 bgcolor=#fefefe
| 600793 ||  || — || November 3, 2010 || Mount Lemmon || Mount Lemmon Survey ||  || align=right data-sort-value="0.56" | 560 m || 
|-id=794 bgcolor=#d6d6d6
| 600794 ||  || — || April 27, 2012 || Haleakala || Pan-STARRS ||  || align=right | 1.9 km || 
|-id=795 bgcolor=#E9E9E9
| 600795 ||  || — || January 26, 2007 || Kitt Peak || Spacewatch ||  || align=right | 1.6 km || 
|-id=796 bgcolor=#E9E9E9
| 600796 ||  || — || May 20, 2012 || Mount Lemmon || Mount Lemmon Survey ||  || align=right data-sort-value="0.68" | 680 m || 
|-id=797 bgcolor=#fefefe
| 600797 ||  || — || August 29, 2005 || Palomar || NEAT ||  || align=right data-sort-value="0.94" | 940 m || 
|-id=798 bgcolor=#fefefe
| 600798 ||  || — || May 27, 2012 || Mount Lemmon || Mount Lemmon Survey ||  || align=right data-sort-value="0.76" | 760 m || 
|-id=799 bgcolor=#E9E9E9
| 600799 ||  || — || May 7, 2016 || Haleakala || Pan-STARRS ||  || align=right data-sort-value="0.71" | 710 m || 
|-id=800 bgcolor=#E9E9E9
| 600800 ||  || — || May 22, 2012 || ESA OGS || ESA OGS ||  || align=right data-sort-value="0.77" | 770 m || 
|}

600801–600900 

|-bgcolor=#fefefe
| 600801 ||  || — || February 12, 2015 || Haleakala || Pan-STARRS ||  || align=right data-sort-value="0.64" | 640 m || 
|-id=802 bgcolor=#fefefe
| 600802 ||  || — || November 4, 1991 || Kitt Peak || Spacewatch || H || align=right data-sort-value="0.78" | 780 m || 
|-id=803 bgcolor=#fefefe
| 600803 ||  || — || June 9, 2012 || Nogales || M. Schwartz, P. R. Holvorcem || H || align=right data-sort-value="0.76" | 760 m || 
|-id=804 bgcolor=#fefefe
| 600804 ||  || — || June 11, 2012 || Haleakala || Pan-STARRS ||  || align=right | 1.6 km || 
|-id=805 bgcolor=#fefefe
| 600805 ||  || — || May 13, 2012 || Mount Lemmon || Mount Lemmon Survey ||  || align=right data-sort-value="0.67" | 670 m || 
|-id=806 bgcolor=#E9E9E9
| 600806 ||  || — || August 30, 2000 || Kitt Peak || Spacewatch ||  || align=right data-sort-value="0.86" | 860 m || 
|-id=807 bgcolor=#E9E9E9
| 600807 ||  || — || January 11, 2011 || Kitt Peak || Spacewatch ||  || align=right | 1.7 km || 
|-id=808 bgcolor=#fefefe
| 600808 ||  || — || November 11, 2010 || Catalina || CSS || H || align=right data-sort-value="0.84" | 840 m || 
|-id=809 bgcolor=#E9E9E9
| 600809 ||  || — || May 21, 2012 || Haleakala || Pan-STARRS ||  || align=right data-sort-value="0.83" | 830 m || 
|-id=810 bgcolor=#E9E9E9
| 600810 ||  || — || February 10, 2011 || Mount Lemmon || Mount Lemmon Survey ||  || align=right data-sort-value="0.74" | 740 m || 
|-id=811 bgcolor=#E9E9E9
| 600811 ||  || — || October 26, 2013 || Mount Lemmon || Mount Lemmon Survey ||  || align=right | 2.0 km || 
|-id=812 bgcolor=#E9E9E9
| 600812 ||  || — || July 30, 2008 || Kitt Peak || Spacewatch ||  || align=right | 1.2 km || 
|-id=813 bgcolor=#d6d6d6
| 600813 ||  || — || June 15, 2012 || Haleakala || Pan-STARRS ||  || align=right | 2.1 km || 
|-id=814 bgcolor=#fefefe
| 600814 ||  || — || June 15, 2012 || Haleakala || Pan-STARRS || H || align=right data-sort-value="0.68" | 680 m || 
|-id=815 bgcolor=#E9E9E9
| 600815 ||  || — || June 9, 2012 || Nogales || M. Schwartz, P. R. Holvorcem ||  || align=right | 1.0 km || 
|-id=816 bgcolor=#d6d6d6
| 600816 ||  || — || May 25, 2012 || ESA OGS || ESA OGS ||  || align=right | 3.7 km || 
|-id=817 bgcolor=#E9E9E9
| 600817 ||  || — || June 16, 2012 || Mount Lemmon || Mount Lemmon Survey ||  || align=right data-sort-value="0.86" | 860 m || 
|-id=818 bgcolor=#E9E9E9
| 600818 ||  || — || May 19, 2012 || Mount Lemmon || Mount Lemmon Survey ||  || align=right | 1.2 km || 
|-id=819 bgcolor=#E9E9E9
| 600819 ||  || — || June 14, 2012 || Mount Lemmon || Mount Lemmon Survey ||  || align=right | 1.2 km || 
|-id=820 bgcolor=#E9E9E9
| 600820 ||  || — || June 17, 2012 || Kitt Peak || Spacewatch ||  || align=right data-sort-value="0.95" | 950 m || 
|-id=821 bgcolor=#E9E9E9
| 600821 ||  || — || November 29, 2013 || Haleakala || Pan-STARRS ||  || align=right data-sort-value="0.78" | 780 m || 
|-id=822 bgcolor=#fefefe
| 600822 ||  || — || September 30, 1997 || Kitt Peak || Spacewatch ||  || align=right data-sort-value="0.72" | 720 m || 
|-id=823 bgcolor=#E9E9E9
| 600823 ||  || — || September 21, 2004 || Kitt Peak || Spacewatch ||  || align=right | 1.3 km || 
|-id=824 bgcolor=#d6d6d6
| 600824 ||  || — || August 8, 2012 || Haleakala || Pan-STARRS || KOR || align=right | 1.0 km || 
|-id=825 bgcolor=#fefefe
| 600825 ||  || — || August 25, 2005 || Palomar || NEAT ||  || align=right data-sort-value="0.68" | 680 m || 
|-id=826 bgcolor=#d6d6d6
| 600826 ||  || — || August 7, 2012 || Marly || P. Kocher ||  || align=right | 2.6 km || 
|-id=827 bgcolor=#E9E9E9
| 600827 ||  || — || December 13, 2009 || Weihai || Shandong University Obs. ||  || align=right | 1.6 km || 
|-id=828 bgcolor=#E9E9E9
| 600828 ||  || — || September 29, 2008 || Mount Lemmon || Mount Lemmon Survey ||  || align=right | 1.1 km || 
|-id=829 bgcolor=#E9E9E9
| 600829 ||  || — || May 21, 2012 || Mount Lemmon || Mount Lemmon Survey ||  || align=right | 1.00 km || 
|-id=830 bgcolor=#fefefe
| 600830 ||  || — || June 16, 2009 || Mount Lemmon || Mount Lemmon Survey || H || align=right data-sort-value="0.70" | 700 m || 
|-id=831 bgcolor=#E9E9E9
| 600831 ||  || — || October 4, 2004 || Kitt Peak || Spacewatch ||  || align=right | 1.3 km || 
|-id=832 bgcolor=#d6d6d6
| 600832 ||  || — || February 22, 2003 || Palomar || NEAT ||  || align=right | 3.7 km || 
|-id=833 bgcolor=#d6d6d6
| 600833 ||  || — || August 12, 2012 || Siding Spring || SSS ||  || align=right | 2.2 km || 
|-id=834 bgcolor=#E9E9E9
| 600834 ||  || — || August 13, 2012 || Haleakala || Pan-STARRS ||  || align=right data-sort-value="0.82" | 820 m || 
|-id=835 bgcolor=#E9E9E9
| 600835 ||  || — || May 28, 2012 || Mount Lemmon || Mount Lemmon Survey ||  || align=right | 1.6 km || 
|-id=836 bgcolor=#E9E9E9
| 600836 ||  || — || August 14, 2012 || Siding Spring || SSS ||  || align=right data-sort-value="0.76" | 760 m || 
|-id=837 bgcolor=#E9E9E9
| 600837 ||  || — || August 13, 2012 || Haleakala || Pan-STARRS ||  || align=right data-sort-value="0.94" | 940 m || 
|-id=838 bgcolor=#fefefe
| 600838 ||  || — || May 28, 2008 || Kitt Peak || Spacewatch ||  || align=right data-sort-value="0.79" | 790 m || 
|-id=839 bgcolor=#FA8072
| 600839 ||  || — || January 4, 2010 || Kitt Peak || Spacewatch ||  || align=right data-sort-value="0.57" | 570 m || 
|-id=840 bgcolor=#fefefe
| 600840 ||  || — || August 12, 2012 || Catalina || CSS ||  || align=right data-sort-value="0.71" | 710 m || 
|-id=841 bgcolor=#E9E9E9
| 600841 ||  || — || August 10, 2012 || Haleakala || Pan-STARRS ||  || align=right data-sort-value="0.89" | 890 m || 
|-id=842 bgcolor=#E9E9E9
| 600842 ||  || — || January 28, 2015 || Haleakala || Pan-STARRS ||  || align=right data-sort-value="0.99" | 990 m || 
|-id=843 bgcolor=#E9E9E9
| 600843 ||  || — || November 6, 2013 || Haleakala || Pan-STARRS ||  || align=right data-sort-value="0.72" | 720 m || 
|-id=844 bgcolor=#d6d6d6
| 600844 ||  || — || November 2, 2007 || Socorro || LINEAR ||  || align=right | 2.5 km || 
|-id=845 bgcolor=#E9E9E9
| 600845 ||  || — || August 14, 2012 || Siding Spring || SSS ||  || align=right | 1.0 km || 
|-id=846 bgcolor=#d6d6d6
| 600846 ||  || — || August 14, 2012 || Haleakala || Pan-STARRS || 3:2 || align=right | 4.3 km || 
|-id=847 bgcolor=#E9E9E9
| 600847 ||  || — || August 9, 2012 || Haleakala || Pan-STARRS ||  || align=right | 1.1 km || 
|-id=848 bgcolor=#fefefe
| 600848 ||  || — || February 28, 2003 || Haleakala || AMOS || H || align=right data-sort-value="0.76" | 760 m || 
|-id=849 bgcolor=#E9E9E9
| 600849 ||  || — || September 3, 2008 || Kitt Peak || Spacewatch ||  || align=right | 1.7 km || 
|-id=850 bgcolor=#fefefe
| 600850 ||  || — || September 19, 2009 || Mount Lemmon || Mount Lemmon Survey ||  || align=right data-sort-value="0.53" | 530 m || 
|-id=851 bgcolor=#d6d6d6
| 600851 ||  || — || August 17, 2012 || Haleakala || Pan-STARRS ||  || align=right | 2.3 km || 
|-id=852 bgcolor=#E9E9E9
| 600852 ||  || — || April 12, 2011 || Mount Lemmon || Mount Lemmon Survey ||  || align=right data-sort-value="0.94" | 940 m || 
|-id=853 bgcolor=#fefefe
| 600853 ||  || — || January 31, 2006 || Kitt Peak || Spacewatch || H || align=right data-sort-value="0.46" | 460 m || 
|-id=854 bgcolor=#fefefe
| 600854 ||  || — || May 28, 2012 || Mount Lemmon || Mount Lemmon Survey ||  || align=right data-sort-value="0.72" | 720 m || 
|-id=855 bgcolor=#d6d6d6
| 600855 ||  || — || August 24, 2012 || Kitt Peak || Spacewatch ||  || align=right | 2.3 km || 
|-id=856 bgcolor=#E9E9E9
| 600856 ||  || — || August 8, 2012 || Haleakala || Pan-STARRS ||  || align=right | 1.2 km || 
|-id=857 bgcolor=#d6d6d6
| 600857 ||  || — || August 10, 2012 || Kitt Peak || Spacewatch ||  || align=right | 2.6 km || 
|-id=858 bgcolor=#E9E9E9
| 600858 ||  || — || March 26, 2003 || Palomar || NEAT ||  || align=right | 1.0 km || 
|-id=859 bgcolor=#fefefe
| 600859 ||  || — || August 29, 2012 || Alder Springs || K. Levin ||  || align=right data-sort-value="0.58" | 580 m || 
|-id=860 bgcolor=#E9E9E9
| 600860 ||  || — || August 26, 2012 || Haleakala || Pan-STARRS ||  || align=right | 1.2 km || 
|-id=861 bgcolor=#fefefe
| 600861 ||  || — || August 25, 2012 || Haleakala || Pan-STARRS ||  || align=right data-sort-value="0.74" | 740 m || 
|-id=862 bgcolor=#fefefe
| 600862 ||  || — || August 26, 2012 || Catalina || CSS ||  || align=right data-sort-value="0.81" | 810 m || 
|-id=863 bgcolor=#E9E9E9
| 600863 ||  || — || August 26, 2012 || Kitt Peak || Spacewatch ||  || align=right | 1.6 km || 
|-id=864 bgcolor=#fefefe
| 600864 ||  || — || October 7, 2004 || Goodricke-Pigott || R. A. Tucker || H || align=right data-sort-value="0.82" | 820 m || 
|-id=865 bgcolor=#fefefe
| 600865 ||  || — || October 6, 2004 || Palomar || NEAT || H || align=right data-sort-value="0.48" | 480 m || 
|-id=866 bgcolor=#E9E9E9
| 600866 ||  || — || September 10, 2012 || Charleston || R. Holmes ||  || align=right data-sort-value="0.86" | 860 m || 
|-id=867 bgcolor=#d6d6d6
| 600867 ||  || — || July 21, 2007 || Lulin || LUSS ||  || align=right | 3.0 km || 
|-id=868 bgcolor=#E9E9E9
| 600868 ||  || — || September 13, 2012 || Charleston || R. Holmes ||  || align=right | 1.7 km || 
|-id=869 bgcolor=#E9E9E9
| 600869 ||  || — || August 25, 2012 || Haleakala || Pan-STARRS ||  || align=right | 1.6 km || 
|-id=870 bgcolor=#E9E9E9
| 600870 ||  || — || September 22, 2008 || Mount Lemmon || Mount Lemmon Survey ||  || align=right | 1.3 km || 
|-id=871 bgcolor=#fefefe
| 600871 ||  || — || March 4, 2011 || Kitt Peak || Spacewatch ||  || align=right data-sort-value="0.74" | 740 m || 
|-id=872 bgcolor=#E9E9E9
| 600872 ||  || — || August 14, 2012 || Kitt Peak || Spacewatch ||  || align=right data-sort-value="0.74" | 740 m || 
|-id=873 bgcolor=#E9E9E9
| 600873 ||  || — || September 15, 2012 || Catalina || CSS ||  || align=right | 1.1 km || 
|-id=874 bgcolor=#fefefe
| 600874 ||  || — || September 1, 2005 || Palomar || NEAT ||  || align=right data-sort-value="0.77" | 770 m || 
|-id=875 bgcolor=#E9E9E9
| 600875 ||  || — || October 22, 2008 || Kitt Peak || Spacewatch ||  || align=right | 1.0 km || 
|-id=876 bgcolor=#fefefe
| 600876 ||  || — || August 16, 2012 || Siding Spring || SSS ||  || align=right | 1.0 km || 
|-id=877 bgcolor=#E9E9E9
| 600877 ||  || — || September 13, 2012 || Siding Spring || SSS ||  || align=right | 1.6 km || 
|-id=878 bgcolor=#E9E9E9
| 600878 ||  || — || August 28, 2003 || Palomar || NEAT ||  || align=right | 2.8 km || 
|-id=879 bgcolor=#d6d6d6
| 600879 ||  || — || September 15, 2012 || Catalina || CSS ||  || align=right | 2.9 km || 
|-id=880 bgcolor=#d6d6d6
| 600880 ||  || — || September 11, 2007 || Mount Lemmon || Mount Lemmon Survey || Tj (2.99) || align=right | 2.6 km || 
|-id=881 bgcolor=#E9E9E9
| 600881 ||  || — || December 19, 2004 || Mount Lemmon || Mount Lemmon Survey ||  || align=right | 1.7 km || 
|-id=882 bgcolor=#E9E9E9
| 600882 ||  || — || September 17, 2012 || Kitt Peak || Spacewatch ||  || align=right data-sort-value="0.97" | 970 m || 
|-id=883 bgcolor=#d6d6d6
| 600883 ||  || — || September 13, 2002 || Palomar || NEAT ||  || align=right | 2.4 km || 
|-id=884 bgcolor=#E9E9E9
| 600884 ||  || — || October 25, 2008 || Kitt Peak || Spacewatch ||  || align=right | 1.5 km || 
|-id=885 bgcolor=#fefefe
| 600885 ||  || — || August 27, 2005 || Palomar || NEAT ||  || align=right data-sort-value="0.51" | 510 m || 
|-id=886 bgcolor=#d6d6d6
| 600886 ||  || — || September 16, 2012 || Catalina || CSS ||  || align=right | 2.8 km || 
|-id=887 bgcolor=#E9E9E9
| 600887 ||  || — || October 25, 2003 || Kitt Peak || Spacewatch ||  || align=right | 1.9 km || 
|-id=888 bgcolor=#C2FFFF
| 600888 ||  || — || December 3, 2002 || Palomar || NEAT || L5 || align=right | 12 km || 
|-id=889 bgcolor=#E9E9E9
| 600889 ||  || — || September 18, 2012 || Mount Lemmon || Mount Lemmon Survey ||  || align=right | 1.2 km || 
|-id=890 bgcolor=#fefefe
| 600890 ||  || — || September 13, 2004 || Kitt Peak || Spacewatch ||  || align=right data-sort-value="0.86" | 860 m || 
|-id=891 bgcolor=#E9E9E9
| 600891 ||  || — || September 18, 2012 || Mount Lemmon || Mount Lemmon Survey ||  || align=right | 1.0 km || 
|-id=892 bgcolor=#E9E9E9
| 600892 ||  || — || August 21, 2003 || Campo Imperatore || CINEOS ||  || align=right | 1.2 km || 
|-id=893 bgcolor=#d6d6d6
| 600893 ||  || — || March 10, 2005 || Mount Lemmon || Mount Lemmon Survey || KOR || align=right | 1.3 km || 
|-id=894 bgcolor=#E9E9E9
| 600894 ||  || — || September 23, 2012 || Mount Lemmon || Mount Lemmon Survey ||  || align=right | 1.4 km || 
|-id=895 bgcolor=#C2FFFF
| 600895 ||  || — || December 3, 2005 || Mauna Kea || Mauna Kea Obs. || L5 || align=right | 8.5 km || 
|-id=896 bgcolor=#d6d6d6
| 600896 ||  || — || September 20, 2006 || Catalina || CSS || Tj (2.99) || align=right | 3.7 km || 
|-id=897 bgcolor=#d6d6d6
| 600897 ||  || — || January 29, 2003 || Palomar || NEAT ||  || align=right | 2.7 km || 
|-id=898 bgcolor=#fefefe
| 600898 ||  || — || August 26, 2012 || Catalina || CSS ||  || align=right data-sort-value="0.70" | 700 m || 
|-id=899 bgcolor=#E9E9E9
| 600899 ||  || — || September 17, 2012 || Mount Lemmon || Mount Lemmon Survey ||  || align=right | 1.2 km || 
|-id=900 bgcolor=#E9E9E9
| 600900 ||  || — || May 12, 2015 || Mount Lemmon || Mount Lemmon Survey ||  || align=right data-sort-value="0.79" | 790 m || 
|}

600901–601000 

|-bgcolor=#d6d6d6
| 600901 ||  || — || September 21, 2012 || Kitt Peak || Spacewatch ||  || align=right | 2.7 km || 
|-id=902 bgcolor=#E9E9E9
| 600902 ||  || — || September 18, 2012 || Mount Lemmon || Mount Lemmon Survey ||  || align=right | 1.1 km || 
|-id=903 bgcolor=#d6d6d6
| 600903 ||  || — || September 22, 2012 || Kitt Peak || Spacewatch ||  || align=right | 1.6 km || 
|-id=904 bgcolor=#E9E9E9
| 600904 ||  || — || September 19, 2012 || Mount Lemmon || Mount Lemmon Survey ||  || align=right | 1.5 km || 
|-id=905 bgcolor=#C2FFFF
| 600905 ||  || — || December 3, 2005 || Mauna Kea || Mauna Kea Obs. || L5 || align=right | 7.1 km || 
|-id=906 bgcolor=#E9E9E9
| 600906 ||  || — || September 15, 2012 || Kitt Peak || Spacewatch ||  || align=right | 1.4 km || 
|-id=907 bgcolor=#d6d6d6
| 600907 ||  || — || October 6, 2012 || Mount Lemmon || Mount Lemmon Survey ||  || align=right | 1.6 km || 
|-id=908 bgcolor=#E9E9E9
| 600908 ||  || — || April 17, 2010 || Mount Lemmon || Mount Lemmon Survey ||  || align=right | 1.4 km || 
|-id=909 bgcolor=#E9E9E9
| 600909 ||  || — || September 15, 2012 || ESA OGS || ESA OGS || EUN || align=right | 1.0 km || 
|-id=910 bgcolor=#E9E9E9
| 600910 ||  || — || February 16, 2010 || Kitt Peak || Spacewatch ||  || align=right | 1.3 km || 
|-id=911 bgcolor=#E9E9E9
| 600911 ||  || — || September 15, 2012 || Kitt Peak || Spacewatch ||  || align=right | 1.9 km || 
|-id=912 bgcolor=#E9E9E9
| 600912 ||  || — || October 6, 1999 || Socorro || LINEAR || JUN || align=right | 1.0 km || 
|-id=913 bgcolor=#E9E9E9
| 600913 ||  || — || September 15, 2012 || Mount Lemmon || Mount Lemmon Survey ||  || align=right | 1.6 km || 
|-id=914 bgcolor=#E9E9E9
| 600914 ||  || — || October 1, 2008 || Mount Lemmon || Mount Lemmon Survey ||  || align=right | 1.2 km || 
|-id=915 bgcolor=#E9E9E9
| 600915 ||  || — || October 8, 2012 || Mount Lemmon || Mount Lemmon Survey ||  || align=right | 1.5 km || 
|-id=916 bgcolor=#E9E9E9
| 600916 ||  || — || October 8, 2012 || Mount Lemmon || Mount Lemmon Survey ||  || align=right | 2.0 km || 
|-id=917 bgcolor=#E9E9E9
| 600917 ||  || — || September 9, 2008 || Mount Lemmon || Mount Lemmon Survey ||  || align=right data-sort-value="0.94" | 940 m || 
|-id=918 bgcolor=#E9E9E9
| 600918 ||  || — || October 8, 2012 || Haleakala || Pan-STARRS ||  || align=right | 1.1 km || 
|-id=919 bgcolor=#C2FFFF
| 600919 ||  || — || November 3, 2003 || Apache Point || SDSS Collaboration || L5 || align=right | 10 km || 
|-id=920 bgcolor=#d6d6d6
| 600920 ||  || — || October 6, 2012 || Kitt Peak || Spacewatch ||  || align=right | 2.3 km || 
|-id=921 bgcolor=#fefefe
| 600921 ||  || — || October 6, 2012 || Mount Lemmon || Mount Lemmon Survey ||  || align=right data-sort-value="0.72" | 720 m || 
|-id=922 bgcolor=#E9E9E9
| 600922 ||  || — || October 27, 2008 || Kitt Peak || Spacewatch ||  || align=right | 1.4 km || 
|-id=923 bgcolor=#E9E9E9
| 600923 ||  || — || October 21, 2008 || Kitt Peak || Spacewatch ||  || align=right | 1.3 km || 
|-id=924 bgcolor=#E9E9E9
| 600924 ||  || — || March 16, 2002 || Haleakala || AMOS ||  || align=right | 1.9 km || 
|-id=925 bgcolor=#d6d6d6
| 600925 ||  || — || October 9, 2007 || Kitt Peak || Spacewatch ||  || align=right | 2.6 km || 
|-id=926 bgcolor=#E9E9E9
| 600926 ||  || — || September 21, 2012 || Kitt Peak || Spacewatch ||  || align=right | 1.4 km || 
|-id=927 bgcolor=#d6d6d6
| 600927 ||  || — || October 9, 2007 || Kitt Peak || Spacewatch ||  || align=right | 1.8 km || 
|-id=928 bgcolor=#fefefe
| 600928 ||  || — || August 24, 2008 || Kitt Peak || Spacewatch ||  || align=right data-sort-value="0.57" | 570 m || 
|-id=929 bgcolor=#FA8072
| 600929 ||  || — || October 27, 2005 || Mount Lemmon || Mount Lemmon Survey ||  || align=right data-sort-value="0.49" | 490 m || 
|-id=930 bgcolor=#E9E9E9
| 600930 ||  || — || September 18, 2003 || Palomar || NEAT ||  || align=right | 1.4 km || 
|-id=931 bgcolor=#E9E9E9
| 600931 ||  || — || October 10, 2012 || Mount Lemmon || Mount Lemmon Survey ||  || align=right data-sort-value="0.89" | 890 m || 
|-id=932 bgcolor=#fefefe
| 600932 ||  || — || September 25, 2012 || Kitt Peak || Spacewatch ||  || align=right data-sort-value="0.48" | 480 m || 
|-id=933 bgcolor=#E9E9E9
| 600933 ||  || — || October 10, 2012 || Mount Lemmon || Mount Lemmon Survey ||  || align=right | 1.6 km || 
|-id=934 bgcolor=#E9E9E9
| 600934 ||  || — || October 8, 2008 || Kitt Peak || Spacewatch ||  || align=right data-sort-value="0.81" | 810 m || 
|-id=935 bgcolor=#C2FFFF
| 600935 ||  || — || July 2, 2011 || Kitt Peak || Spacewatch || L5 || align=right | 9.7 km || 
|-id=936 bgcolor=#fefefe
| 600936 ||  || — || September 26, 2012 || Haleakala || Pan-STARRS || H || align=right data-sort-value="0.64" | 640 m || 
|-id=937 bgcolor=#E9E9E9
| 600937 ||  || — || September 17, 2003 || Kitt Peak || Spacewatch ||  || align=right | 2.5 km || 
|-id=938 bgcolor=#E9E9E9
| 600938 ||  || — || October 6, 2012 || Haleakala || Pan-STARRS ||  || align=right | 1.3 km || 
|-id=939 bgcolor=#d6d6d6
| 600939 ||  || — || October 7, 2012 || Haleakala || Pan-STARRS ||  || align=right | 2.1 km || 
|-id=940 bgcolor=#E9E9E9
| 600940 ||  || — || October 8, 2012 || Nogales || M. Schwartz, P. R. Holvorcem ||  || align=right | 1.5 km || 
|-id=941 bgcolor=#E9E9E9
| 600941 ||  || — || September 20, 2003 || Palomar || NEAT ||  || align=right | 1.7 km || 
|-id=942 bgcolor=#E9E9E9
| 600942 ||  || — || April 13, 2011 || Kitt Peak || Spacewatch ||  || align=right | 1.2 km || 
|-id=943 bgcolor=#d6d6d6
| 600943 ||  || — || December 31, 2008 || Kitt Peak || Spacewatch ||  || align=right | 2.2 km || 
|-id=944 bgcolor=#E9E9E9
| 600944 ||  || — || September 28, 2003 || Kitt Peak || Spacewatch ||  || align=right | 1.6 km || 
|-id=945 bgcolor=#E9E9E9
| 600945 ||  || — || October 8, 2012 || Mount Lemmon || Mount Lemmon Survey ||  || align=right | 1.3 km || 
|-id=946 bgcolor=#E9E9E9
| 600946 ||  || — || October 8, 2012 || Haleakala || Pan-STARRS ||  || align=right | 1.4 km || 
|-id=947 bgcolor=#d6d6d6
| 600947 ||  || — || March 28, 2009 || Kitt Peak || Spacewatch ||  || align=right | 2.1 km || 
|-id=948 bgcolor=#fefefe
| 600948 ||  || — || August 6, 2008 || Eygalayes || P. Sogorb || NYS || align=right data-sort-value="0.64" | 640 m || 
|-id=949 bgcolor=#E9E9E9
| 600949 ||  || — || October 8, 2012 || Haleakala || Pan-STARRS ||  || align=right | 2.0 km || 
|-id=950 bgcolor=#E9E9E9
| 600950 ||  || — || September 20, 2003 || Kitt Peak || Spacewatch ||  || align=right | 1.4 km || 
|-id=951 bgcolor=#d6d6d6
| 600951 ||  || — || September 14, 2007 || Mount Lemmon || Mount Lemmon Survey || KOR || align=right | 1.0 km || 
|-id=952 bgcolor=#d6d6d6
| 600952 ||  || — || January 25, 2009 || Kitt Peak || Spacewatch ||  || align=right | 2.0 km || 
|-id=953 bgcolor=#E9E9E9
| 600953 ||  || — || September 17, 2012 || Mount Lemmon || Mount Lemmon Survey ||  || align=right | 1.2 km || 
|-id=954 bgcolor=#E9E9E9
| 600954 ||  || — || September 29, 2003 || Kitt Peak || Spacewatch ||  || align=right | 1.3 km || 
|-id=955 bgcolor=#E9E9E9
| 600955 ||  || — || October 25, 2008 || Kitt Peak || Spacewatch ||  || align=right | 1.1 km || 
|-id=956 bgcolor=#E9E9E9
| 600956 ||  || — || September 19, 2003 || Anderson Mesa || LONEOS ||  || align=right | 1.9 km || 
|-id=957 bgcolor=#E9E9E9
| 600957 ||  || — || October 9, 2008 || Mount Lemmon || Mount Lemmon Survey ||  || align=right data-sort-value="0.74" | 740 m || 
|-id=958 bgcolor=#E9E9E9
| 600958 ||  || — || March 13, 2005 || Kitt Peak || Spacewatch ||  || align=right | 1.5 km || 
|-id=959 bgcolor=#fefefe
| 600959 ||  || — || December 15, 2006 || Kitt Peak || Spacewatch ||  || align=right data-sort-value="0.99" | 990 m || 
|-id=960 bgcolor=#d6d6d6
| 600960 ||  || — || October 6, 2012 || Mount Lemmon || Mount Lemmon Survey ||  || align=right | 2.2 km || 
|-id=961 bgcolor=#E9E9E9
| 600961 ||  || — || October 15, 2012 || Haleakala || Pan-STARRS ||  || align=right | 1.4 km || 
|-id=962 bgcolor=#E9E9E9
| 600962 ||  || — || October 8, 2012 || Haleakala || Pan-STARRS ||  || align=right | 1.9 km || 
|-id=963 bgcolor=#E9E9E9
| 600963 ||  || — || October 10, 2012 || Mount Lemmon || Mount Lemmon Survey ||  || align=right | 1.5 km || 
|-id=964 bgcolor=#E9E9E9
| 600964 ||  || — || March 14, 2005 || Mount Lemmon || Mount Lemmon Survey ||  || align=right | 1.5 km || 
|-id=965 bgcolor=#d6d6d6
| 600965 ||  || — || October 6, 2007 || Kitt Peak || Spacewatch ||  || align=right | 2.3 km || 
|-id=966 bgcolor=#E9E9E9
| 600966 ||  || — || October 11, 2012 || Haleakala || Pan-STARRS ||  || align=right | 1.4 km || 
|-id=967 bgcolor=#E9E9E9
| 600967 ||  || — || October 6, 2012 || Mount Lemmon || Mount Lemmon Survey ||  || align=right | 1.3 km || 
|-id=968 bgcolor=#E9E9E9
| 600968 ||  || — || November 3, 2008 || Mount Lemmon || Mount Lemmon Survey ||  || align=right | 1.4 km || 
|-id=969 bgcolor=#d6d6d6
| 600969 ||  || — || September 21, 2012 || Kitt Peak || Spacewatch ||  || align=right | 2.2 km || 
|-id=970 bgcolor=#E9E9E9
| 600970 ||  || — || October 11, 2012 || Mount Lemmon || Mount Lemmon Survey ||  || align=right | 1.9 km || 
|-id=971 bgcolor=#d6d6d6
| 600971 ||  || — || October 7, 2012 || Kitt Peak || Spacewatch ||  || align=right | 3.2 km || 
|-id=972 bgcolor=#d6d6d6
| 600972 ||  || — || October 6, 2012 || Kitt Peak || Spacewatch ||  || align=right | 2.2 km || 
|-id=973 bgcolor=#E9E9E9
| 600973 ||  || — || October 14, 2012 || Kitt Peak || Spacewatch ||  || align=right | 1.8 km || 
|-id=974 bgcolor=#d6d6d6
| 600974 ||  || — || October 6, 2012 || Kitt Peak || Spacewatch ||  || align=right | 3.1 km || 
|-id=975 bgcolor=#E9E9E9
| 600975 ||  || — || September 26, 2003 || Apache Point || SDSS Collaboration || EUN || align=right | 1.2 km || 
|-id=976 bgcolor=#E9E9E9
| 600976 ||  || — || September 25, 2003 || Palomar || NEAT ||  || align=right | 2.0 km || 
|-id=977 bgcolor=#E9E9E9
| 600977 ||  || — || October 21, 2008 || Kitt Peak || Spacewatch ||  || align=right | 1.3 km || 
|-id=978 bgcolor=#d6d6d6
| 600978 ||  || — || October 14, 2012 || Catalina || CSS ||  || align=right | 3.3 km || 
|-id=979 bgcolor=#E9E9E9
| 600979 ||  || — || May 16, 2007 || Kitt Peak || Spacewatch ||  || align=right | 1.3 km || 
|-id=980 bgcolor=#fefefe
| 600980 ||  || — || December 8, 2005 || Kitt Peak || Spacewatch ||  || align=right | 1.0 km || 
|-id=981 bgcolor=#d6d6d6
| 600981 ||  || — || November 4, 2007 || Kitt Peak || Spacewatch ||  || align=right | 2.0 km || 
|-id=982 bgcolor=#E9E9E9
| 600982 ||  || — || September 19, 2012 || Mount Lemmon || Mount Lemmon Survey ||  || align=right | 1.4 km || 
|-id=983 bgcolor=#d6d6d6
| 600983 ||  || — || October 8, 2012 || Kitt Peak || Spacewatch ||  || align=right | 2.3 km || 
|-id=984 bgcolor=#E9E9E9
| 600984 ||  || — || October 8, 2012 || Mount Lemmon || Mount Lemmon Survey ||  || align=right | 1.2 km || 
|-id=985 bgcolor=#E9E9E9
| 600985 ||  || — || September 22, 2003 || Kitt Peak || Spacewatch ||  || align=right | 1.7 km || 
|-id=986 bgcolor=#E9E9E9
| 600986 ||  || — || October 10, 2012 || Haleakala || Pan-STARRS ||  || align=right | 1.3 km || 
|-id=987 bgcolor=#E9E9E9
| 600987 ||  || — || November 5, 2013 || Haleakala || Pan-STARRS ||  || align=right | 2.3 km || 
|-id=988 bgcolor=#E9E9E9
| 600988 ||  || — || September 25, 2016 || Haleakala || Pan-STARRS ||  || align=right | 1.0 km || 
|-id=989 bgcolor=#d6d6d6
| 600989 ||  || — || October 15, 2012 || Haleakala || Pan-STARRS ||  || align=right | 1.6 km || 
|-id=990 bgcolor=#d6d6d6
| 600990 ||  || — || October 8, 2012 || Mount Lemmon || Mount Lemmon Survey ||  || align=right | 2.0 km || 
|-id=991 bgcolor=#E9E9E9
| 600991 ||  || — || October 14, 2012 || Mount Lemmon || Mount Lemmon Survey ||  || align=right data-sort-value="0.85" | 850 m || 
|-id=992 bgcolor=#E9E9E9
| 600992 ||  || — || October 9, 2012 || Mount Lemmon || Mount Lemmon Survey ||  || align=right | 1.5 km || 
|-id=993 bgcolor=#fefefe
| 600993 ||  || — || September 25, 2005 || Kitt Peak || Spacewatch ||  || align=right data-sort-value="0.45" | 450 m || 
|-id=994 bgcolor=#d6d6d6
| 600994 ||  || — || October 7, 2012 || Haleakala || Pan-STARRS ||  || align=right | 2.4 km || 
|-id=995 bgcolor=#fefefe
| 600995 ||  || — || March 20, 1999 || Apache Point || SDSS Collaboration ||  || align=right data-sort-value="0.55" | 550 m || 
|-id=996 bgcolor=#E9E9E9
| 600996 ||  || — || October 9, 2012 || Mount Lemmon || Mount Lemmon Survey ||  || align=right | 1.1 km || 
|-id=997 bgcolor=#C2FFFF
| 600997 ||  || — || October 24, 2013 || Mount Lemmon || Mount Lemmon Survey || L5 || align=right | 7.0 km || 
|-id=998 bgcolor=#E9E9E9
| 600998 ||  || — || October 11, 2012 || Haleakala || Pan-STARRS ||  || align=right | 1.7 km || 
|-id=999 bgcolor=#E9E9E9
| 600999 ||  || — || October 14, 2012 || Kitt Peak || Spacewatch ||  || align=right data-sort-value="0.70" | 700 m || 
|-id=000 bgcolor=#E9E9E9
| 601000 ||  || — || October 6, 2012 || Kitt Peak || Spacewatch ||  || align=right | 1.7 km || 
|}

References

External links 
 Discovery Circumstances: Numbered Minor Planets (600001)–(605000) (IAU Minor Planet Center)

0600